= Tutankhamun (TV series) =

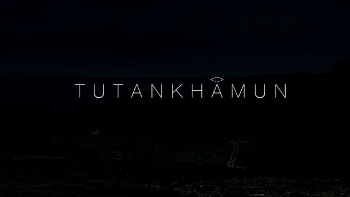
- First episode titlecard
- Genre: Historical drama Biography; Adventure
- Written by: Guy Burt
- Directed by: Peter Webber
- Starring: Max Irons; Sam Neill
- Composer: Christian Henson
- Country of origin: United Kingdom
- Original language: English
- No. of series: 1
- No. of episodes: 4

Production
- Executive producers: Francis Hopkinson; Catherine Oldfield
- Producer: Simon Lewis
- Cinematography: David Raedeker
- Editor: David Head
- Running time: 180 mins.
- Production companies: Tall Story Pictures; ITV Studios

Original release
- Network: ITV
- Release: 16 October – 6 November 2016

Tutankhamun is a 2016 British adventure-drama serial, produced by ITV and Tall Story Pictures, which is based on the discovery of Tutankhamun's tomb by Howard Carter, directed by Peter Webber from a screenplay by BAFTA award-winning writer Guy Burt.

== Plot ==
Archaeologist Howard Carter (Max Irons) stumbles upon evidence of an undiscovered tomb of one of Egypt's forgotten Pharaohs, Tutankhamun. His peers, however, dismiss the idea, save for one man: the wealthy Lord Carnarvon (Sam Neill), a born gambler and thrill-seeker, who agrees to fund Carter's digs.

== Cast ==
- Max Irons as Howard Carter
- Sam Neill as Lord Carnarvon
- Susan Danford as Lady Carnarvon
- Amy Wren as Lady Evelyn Herbert
- Catherine Steadman as Maggie Lewis
- Nicolas Beaucaire as Pierre Lacau
- Jonathan Aris as Herbert Winlock
- Rupert Vansittart as Flinders Petrie
- Vincent Grass as Gaston Maspero
- Anthony Higgins as Theodore Davis
- Leon Clingman as Arthur Mace
- Vere Tindale as Harry Burton
- Adam Neill as Arthur Callender

== Episodes ==
No.	Title	Directed by	Written by	Original release date	UK viewers (millions)
1	"Episode 1.1"	Peter Webber	Guy Burt	16 October 2016	6.65
2	"Episode 1.2"	Peter Webber	Guy Burt	23 October 2016	5.65
3	"Episode 1.3"	Peter Webber	Guy Burt	30 October 2016	5.40
4	"Episode 1.4"	Peter Webber	Guy Burt	6 November 2016	5.08

== Music ==
The score was composed by Spitfire Audio co-founder Christian Henson and was recorded at AIR Lyndhurst Studios, London.

== Home media ==
The series was released by ITV on DVD on 7 November 2016. The soundtrack by Christian Henson is available on CD and streaming services.

== Reception ==
The Guardian found the series "not 100% historically accurate, ... It’s just a bit of fun." and recommended it for fans of Downton Abbey.

The Daily Telegraph also commented on the lack of historical accuracy of the series, which portrayed an affair between Carter and Lady Evelyn, the Telegraph quoting the 8th Earl of Carnarvon as saying "there was no romance, it just did not happen that way".
