= KV15 =

Ancient Egyptian tomb in the Valley of the Kings

- Burial site of Seti II
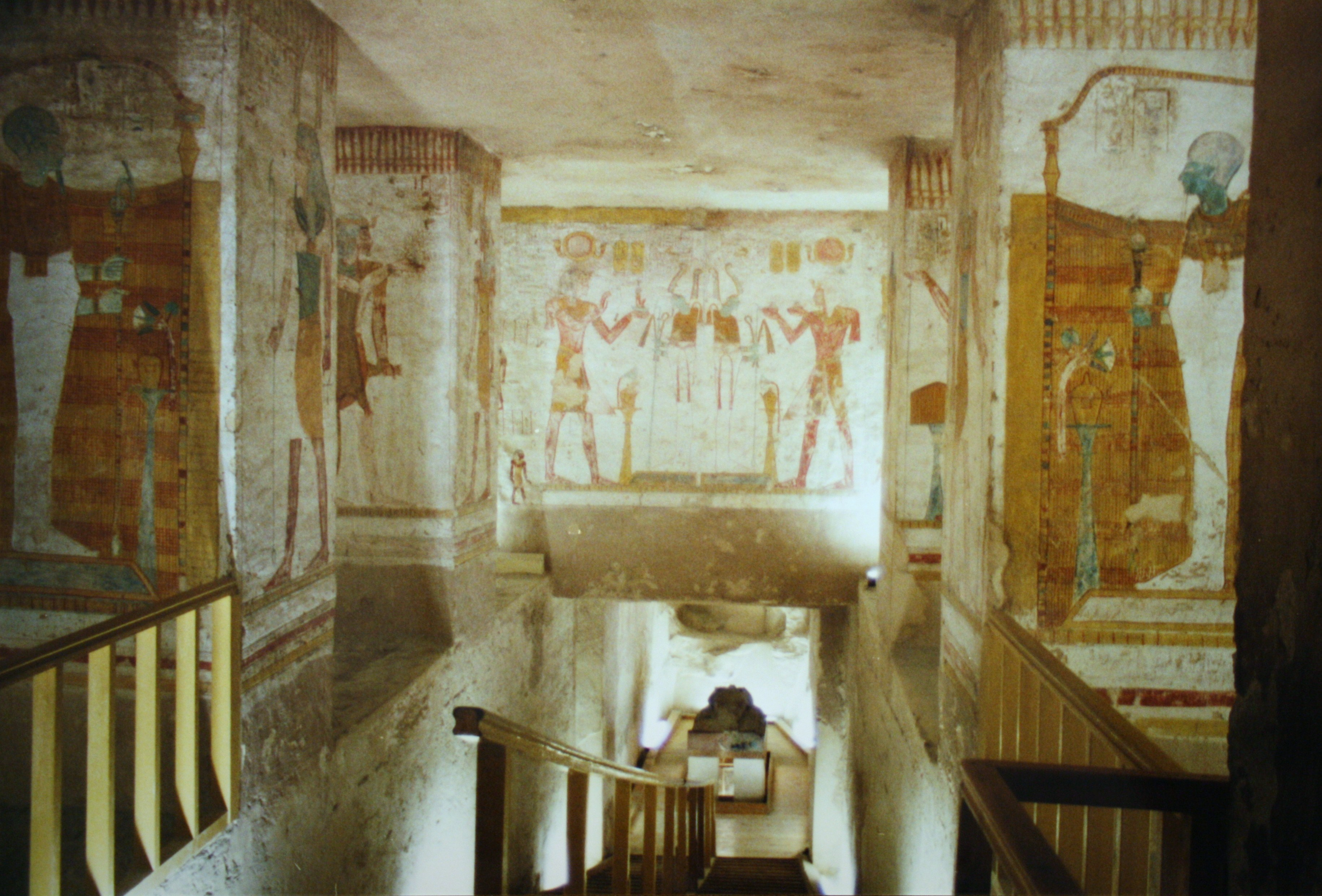
- KV15 (photo taken in June 2002)

- Location within Egypt
- Coordinates: 25°44′19.3″N 32°35′59.6″E
- Location: East Valley of the Kings
- Discovered: Open in antiquity
- Excavated by: Howard Carter (1903–1904)
- Decoration: Anubis jackals and followers of Ra and Osiris; Nut; Litany of Re' Amduat; Book of Gates.
- Layout: Straight axis
- ← Previous; KV14 Next → KV16

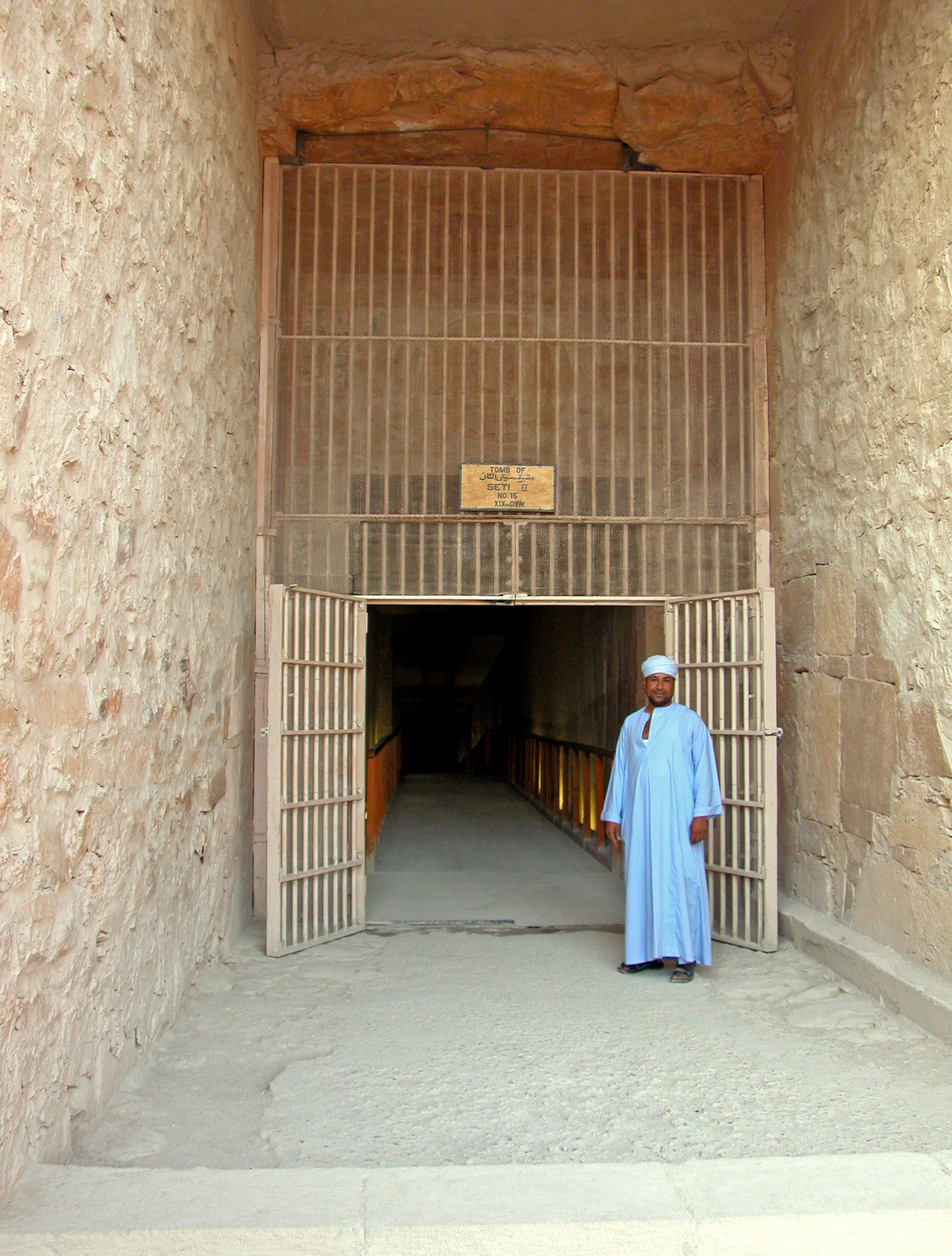
Entrance to Tomb KV15

Tomb KV15, located in the Valley of the Kings in Egypt, was used for the burial of Pharaoh Seti II of the Nineteenth Dynasty. The tomb was dug into the base of a near-vertical cliff face at the head of a wadi running southwest from the main part of the Valley of the Kings. It runs along a northwest-to-southeast axis, comprising a short entry corridor followed by three corridor segments, which terminate in a well room that lacks a well, which was never dug. This then connects with a four-pillared hall and another stretch of corridor that was converted into a burial chamber.

The walls and ceiling of the chamber were covered with plaster and painted with Anubis jackals and two rows of deities, representing the followers of Ra and Osiris, which are placed over a lower row of mummy-like figures. The winged goddess Nut appears along the length of the ceiling and what may be a representation of the Ba of Ra is painted above her head. The paintings are conventional depictions drawn from the Egyptian Litany of Re, Amduat and the Book of Gates. Wall paintings in the well room are more unusual showing the king in shrines in a number of different manifestations; for instance on the back of a panther or on a papyrus skiff. The objects shown in the paintings are reflected in the finds made in the tomb of Tutankhamun.

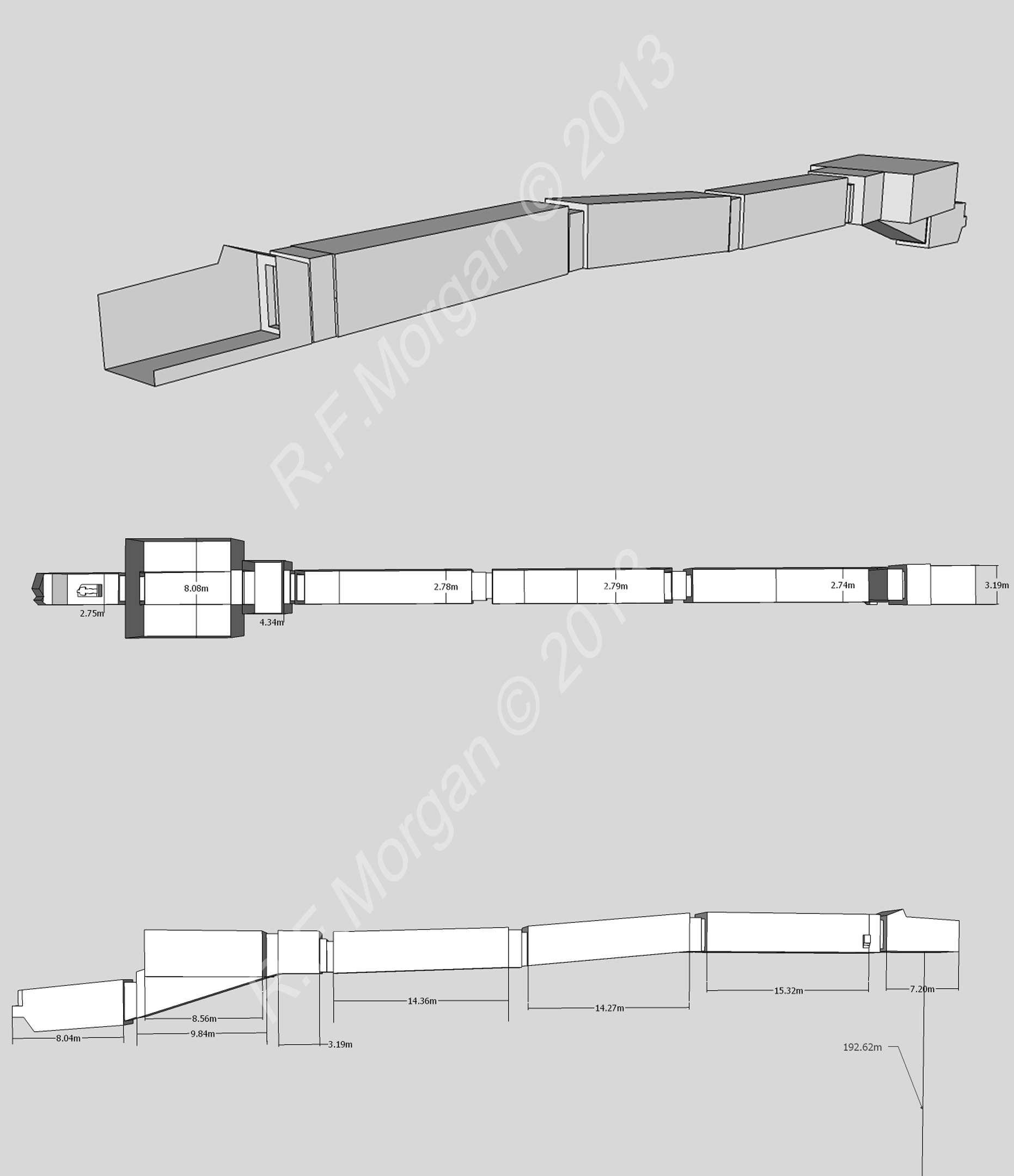
KV15 schematic

Relatively little is known about the history of the tomb. Seti II was buried there, but he may have originally been buried with his wife Tausert in her tomb in KV14 and subsequently moved to the hastily finished (but mostly unfinished) KV15 tomb, perhaps by the later pharaoh Setnakhte, who took over KV14 for his own tomb. Seti's name appears to have been carved, erased and then re-carved. The usurper Amenmesse was likely responsible for the erasures, while agents from Seti II, Tausert or even Setnakhte may have had Seti's name restored.

Seti II had only 4 years to complete his royal tomb since he lost control of Thebes and Upper Egypt to Amenmesse sometime between his 2nd through to his 5th regnal year since he is completely unattested in Upper Egypt during this time. He had a reign of less than 6 regnal years. This accounts for the unfinished state of Seti II's royal tomb. He is completely unattested in Years 3 and 4 of his reign in Upper Egypt--where the Valley of the Kings is located. It's possible that after recovering control of Thebes and Upper Egypt from Amenmesse, Seti attempted to restart construction on his tomb, but died before he can do so and was instead buried in Tausert's tomb. Later, when Setnakhte took over KV14 for his own use, he had KV15 refurbished and hastly finished, so Seti's mummy can be interred in the tomb as originally intended. Seti's mummy was later moved to the mummy cache in tomb KV35; only the lid of his sarcophagus remains in KV15.

KV15 is known to have been opened in antiquity, since there are 59 examples of Greek and Latin graffiti on the walls. Richard Pococke investigated it as early as 1738, but it was not until the arrival of Howard Carter in 1903–04 that the tomb was properly cleared. After Carter began to excavate the nearby tomb of Tutankhamun (KV62) in 1922, KV15 was used by his assistants Alfred Lucas and Arthur Mace as a makeshift laboratory for the cleaning and restoration of KV62's artifacts before their transport to the Cairo Museum.

The tomb is open to tourists with improved flooring, handrails and lighting. KV15 shows a tomb that was mostly unfinished at its closure with several hastily drawn artists hand concepts for future decorations in places.

== Gallery ==
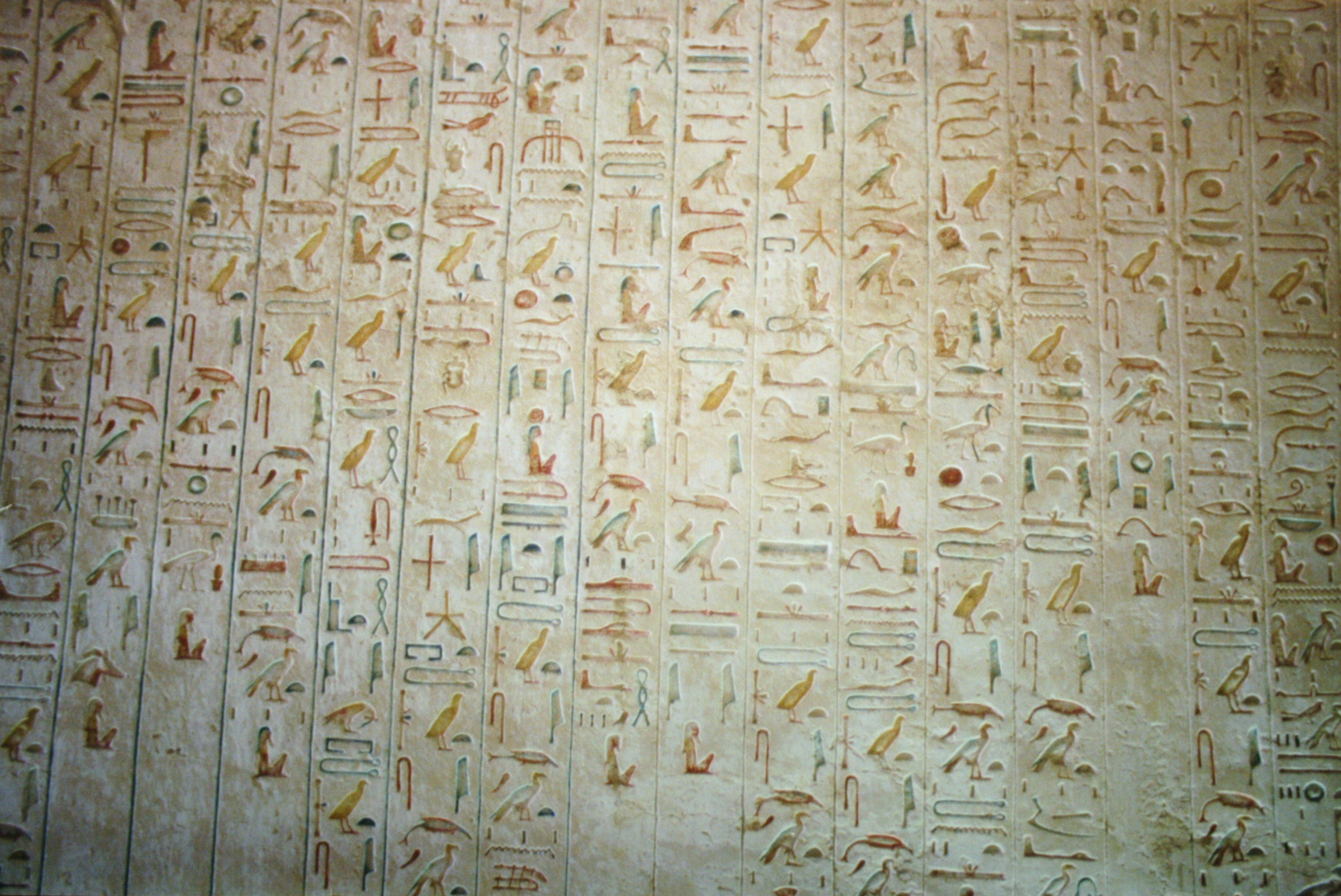
Painted relief in tomb KV15

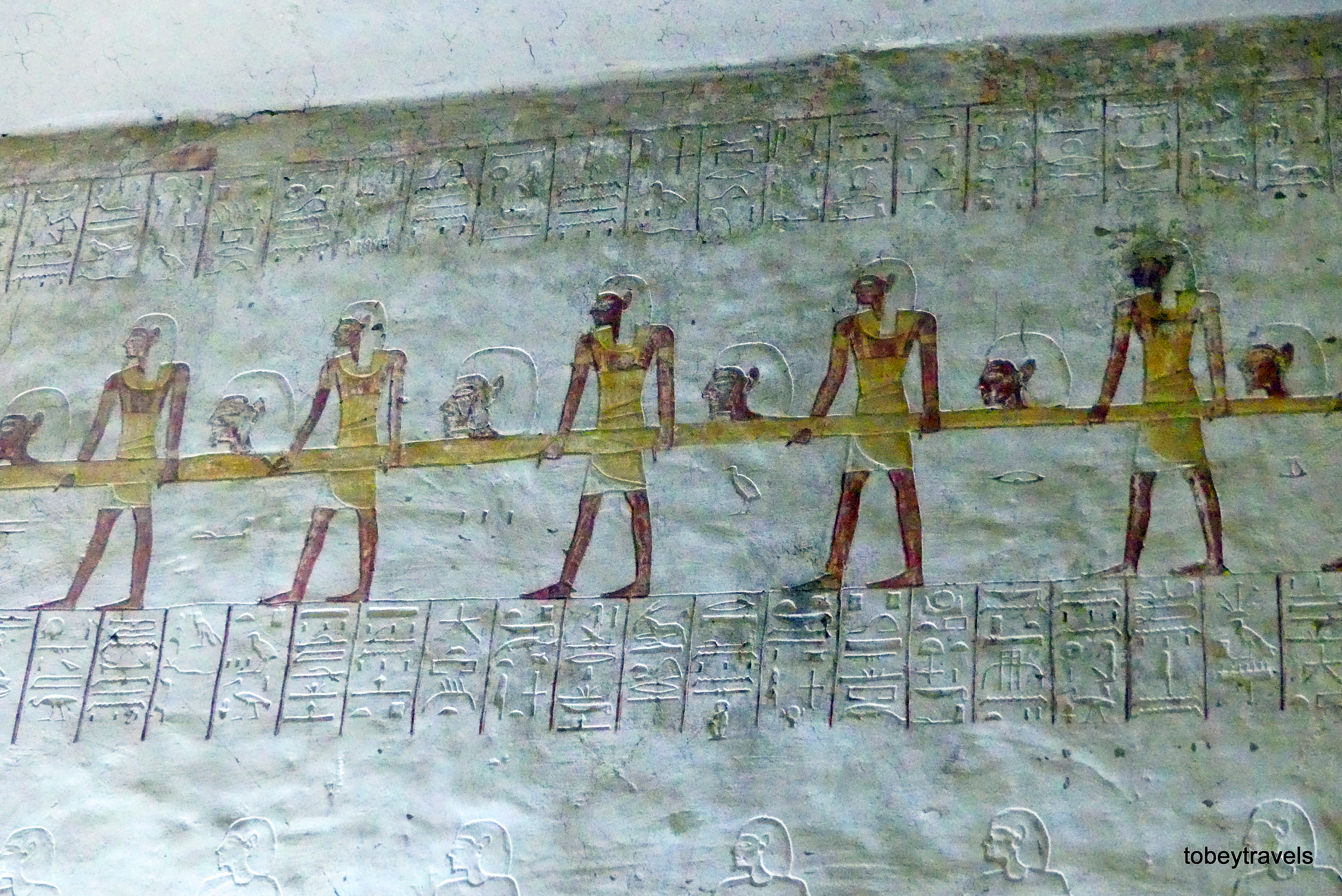
Wall reliefs from the burial chamber of KV15

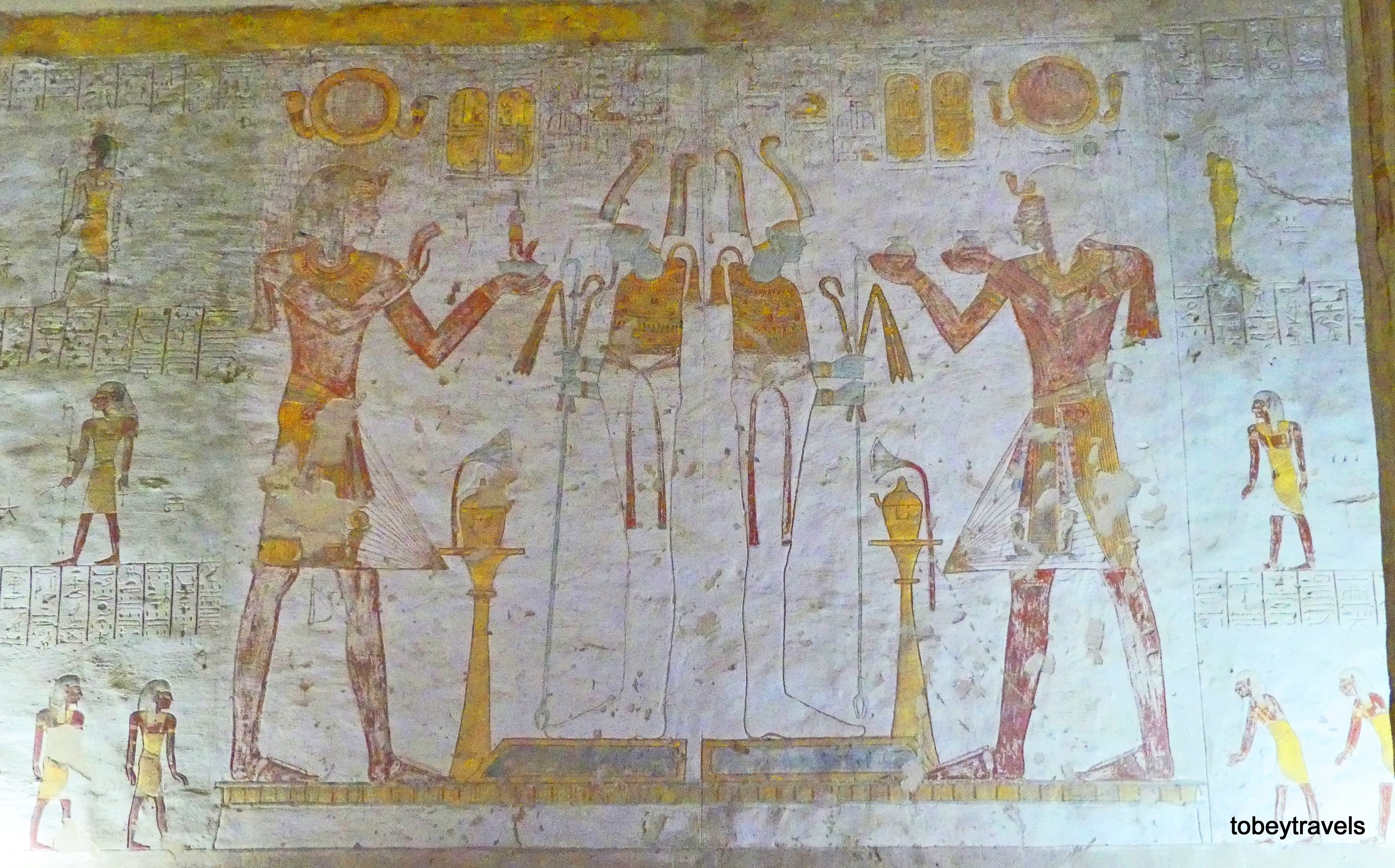
Unique double image of Seti II making an offering to Osiris

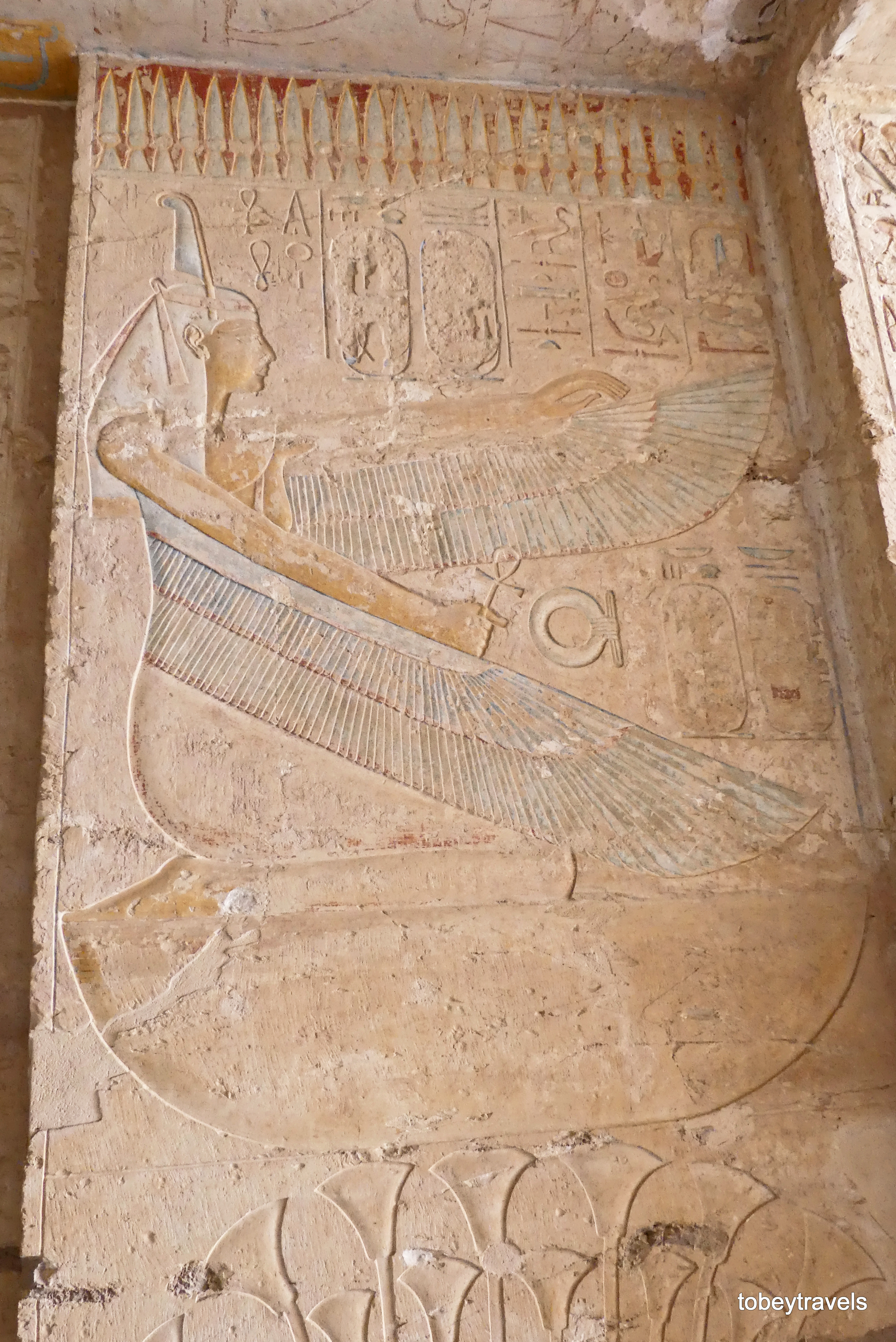
This unpainted relief of Maat in tomb KV15 reflects the shortness of Seti II's reign after he recaptured Upper Egypt from Amenmesse in his 5th Regnal Year

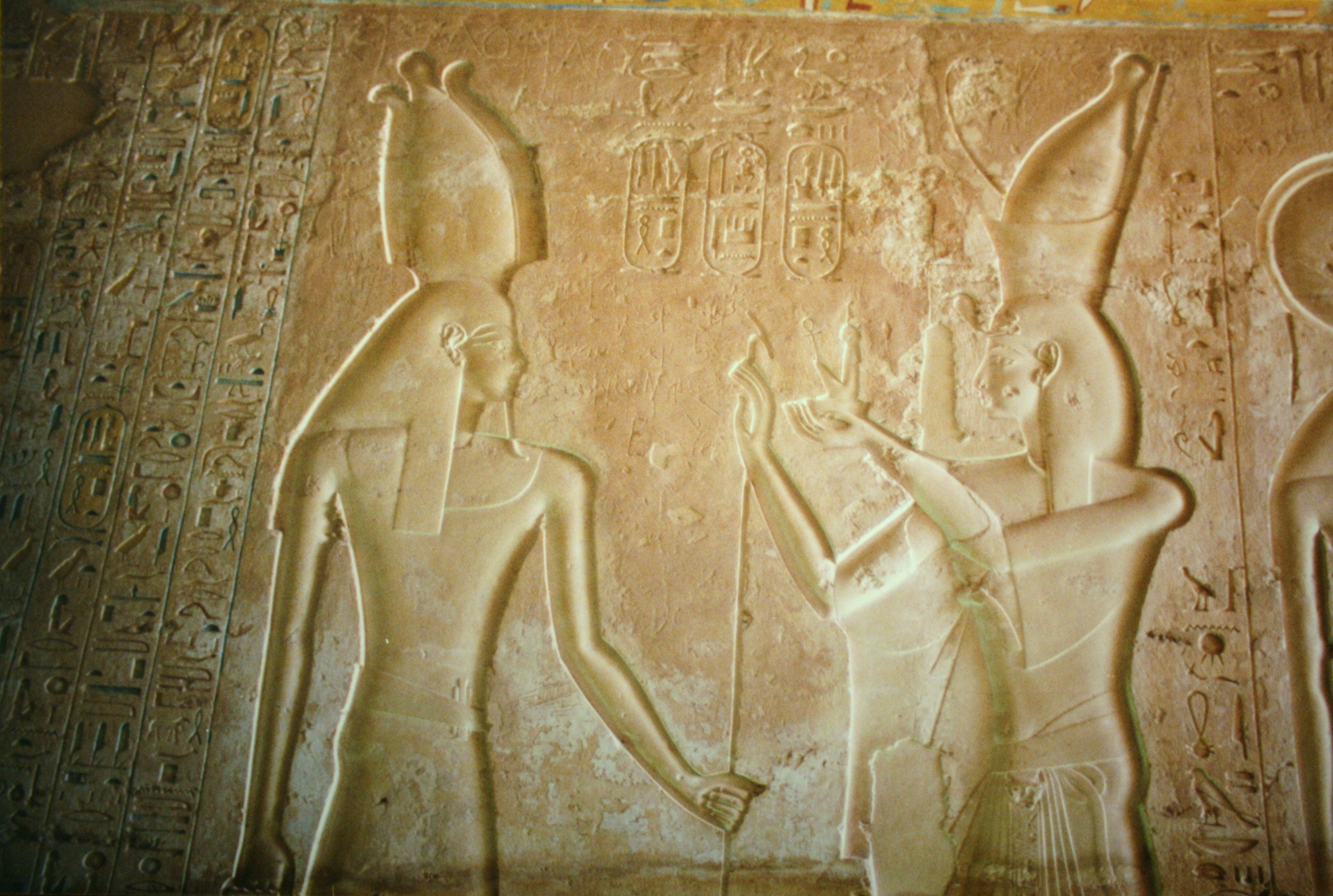
Another undecorated and unpainted relief of Seti II from his KV15 tomb before a deity
