= Lotus chalice =

Artifact found in the tomb of Tutankhamun

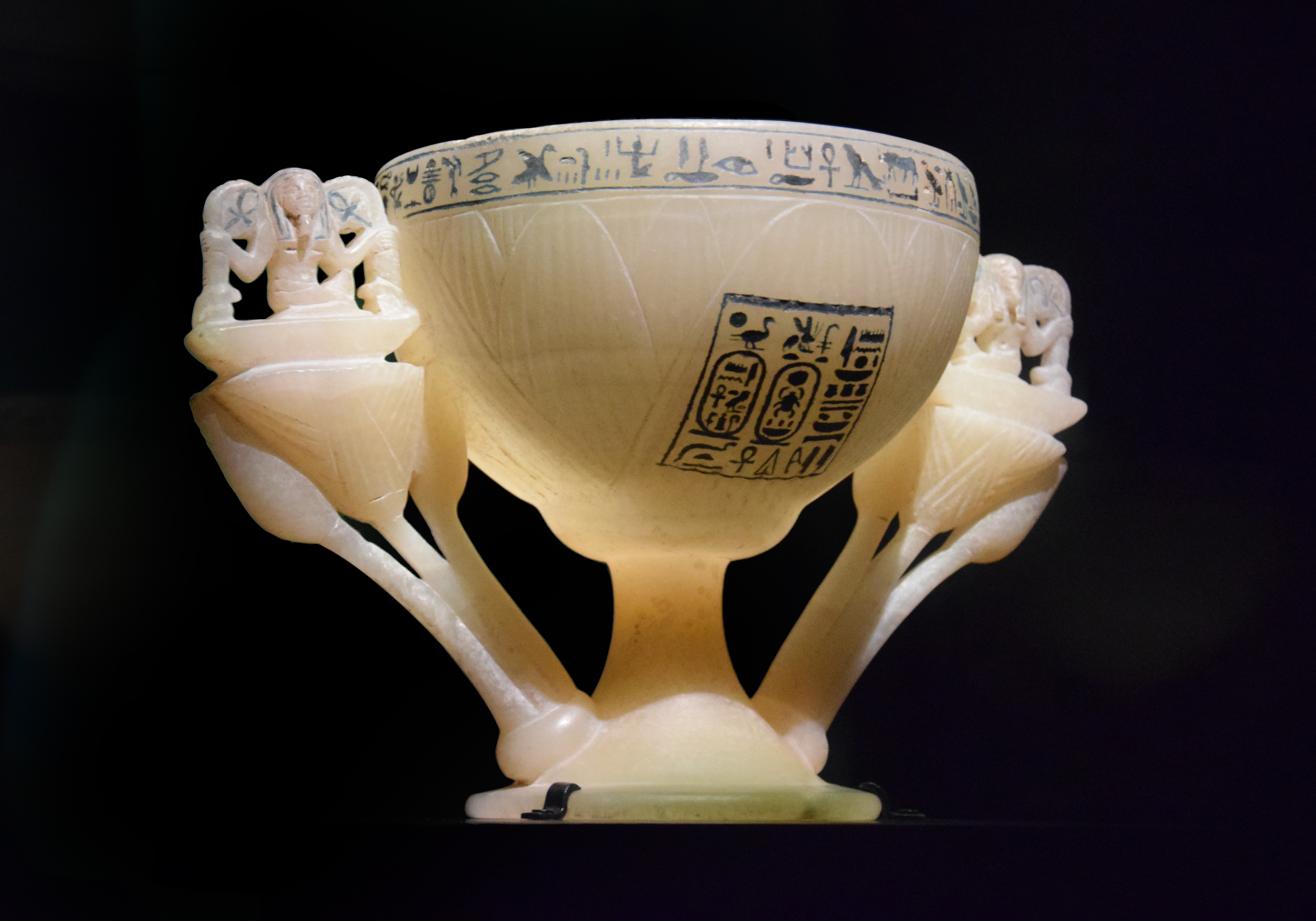
- The lotus chalice in the exhibition Tutankhamun: Treasures of the Golden Pharaoh.
- Material: Alabaster
- Size: 18.3 cm high, 28.3 cm wide, cup depth is 16.8 cm.
- Created: Reign of Tutankhamun (c. 1332–1323 BC), 18th dynasty, New Kingdom
- Discovered: Tomb of Tutankhamun (KV62), Valley of the Kings
- Present location: Egyptian Museum, Cairo
- Identification: JE 67465, Find number 14, GEM 36

The Lotus chalice or Alabaster chalice, called the Wishing Cup by Howard Carter, derives from the tomb of the Ancient Egyptian pharaoh Tutankhamun of the 18th Dynasty. The object received the find number 014 and was on display in the Egyptian Museum in Cairo, with the inventory numbers JE 67465 and GEM 36. It has been moved to the Grand Egyptian Museum.

== Discovery ==
The tomb of the young king (KV62) was uncovered almost untouched in the Valley of the Kings in West Thebes by Howard Carter on 4 November 1922. The lotus chalice was one of the first objects that Carter and his excavators found on entering the tomb; the vessel was on the floor immediately inside the antechamber. This was not its original position.

== Material and significance ==
Heh kneeling on the Nebu symbol with the symbols of infinity: Shen ring, tadpoles and palm rib

The lotus chalice is carved from a single piece of alabaster. The chalice takes the shape of a white lotus in full bloom, identified by its rounded petals. The supports for the handles are shaped like blue lotus flowers which are flanked by buds growing upward, with the god Heh seated on a basket (the neb symbol) on the tips of the petals. In each hand Heh holds a palm rib with notches for counting the years; each palm rib rests on the back of a tadpole sitting on a shen ring. At the upper end of each palm rib there is an ankh symbol, the sign of life. This is a typical depiction of the god of the "million years", the god of infinity and eternity: the palm rib is the hieroglyph for year, while the tadpole represented 100,000 and the shen ring symbolised eternity. A kneeling image of the god was the hieroglyph for the number "one million". The same motif is found on other items from the tomb like the cedar chair (JE 62029, find number 87). The chalice therefore symbolises the infinite and eternal life of King Tutankhamun.

The lotus is significant in Egyptian mythology for the birth of the sun god, who emerged from the lotus, after it had risen out of the flood of the primeval waters of Nun. The name of the king in the centre of the white open flower therefore symbolised his rebirth. This iconography is seen more literally in the Head of Nefertem which depicts Tutankhamun emerging from a blue lotus as the newly risen sun god.

== Inscriptions ==
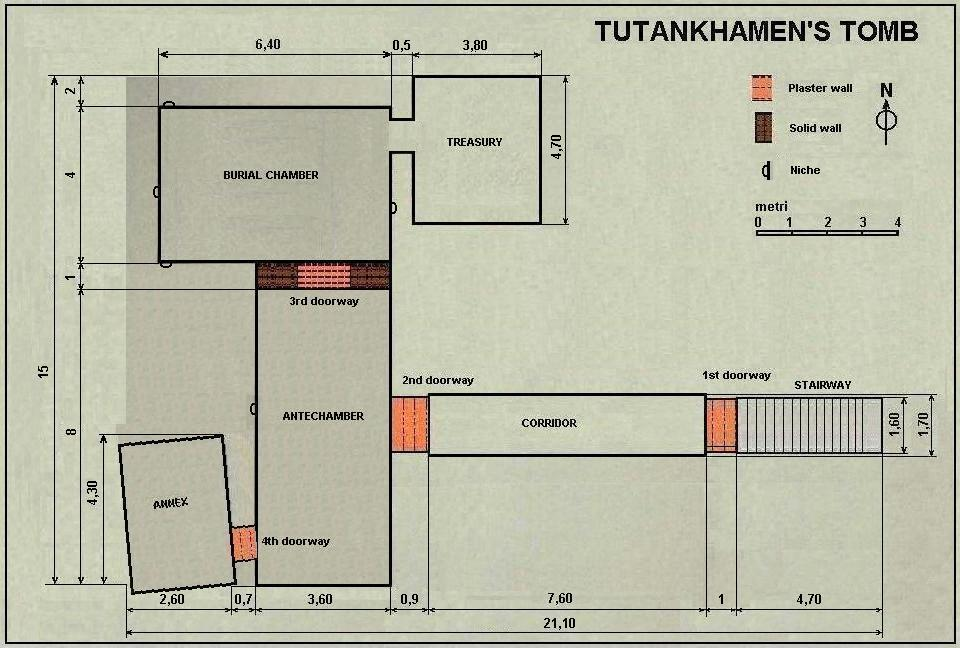
Floorplan of KV62

The inscriptions are engraved and filled with blue pigment. Howard Carter copied the inscriptions and asked Alan Gardiner to provide a translation, since he required this for publication. The main lotus, which forms the actual cup, had the king's prenomen or throne name 'Nebkheperure' and his nomen or personal name 'Tutankhamun' inscribed on it with the epithet 'beloved of Amun-Re, lord of the Thrones of the Two Lands and lord of heaven, given life for ever.' The writing runs from right to left.

The inscription on the rim of the chalice is to be read in two directions. From left to right, beginning with the central ankh is the full five-fold titulary of Tutankhamun:

May (he) live, the Horus Mighty Bull, beautiful of birth, the Two Ladies Goodly of Laws, who pacifies the Two Lands, the Horus of Gold Exalted of Crowns, who placates the gods, King of Upper and Lower Egypt and the Lord of the Two Lands Nebkheperure, given life.

From right to left, beginning again with the ankh symbol, is the following:

May your ka live, may you spend millions of years, you who love Thebes, sitting with your face to the north wind, your eyes beholding happiness.

Because of the inscription, Howard Carter called the lotus chalice the King's Wishing Cup. The wish inscription from the lotus chalice is quoted on the second gravestone of Howard Carter.

== Display ==
In addition to being displayed in the Egyptian Museum in Cairo, the lotus chalice was among the original finds selected for the first temporary exhibition of the grave goods of Tutankhamun. It was also on display with exhibition number 39 in the world-touring Treasures of Tutankhamun exhibition.

== Bibliography ==
- Jürgen Settgast. Alabaster-Kelch in Ausstellungskatalog Tutanchamun in Köln. von Zabern, Mainz 1980, ISBN 3-8053-0438-2, p. 138.
- Zahi Hawass. King Tutankhamun. The Treasures Of The Tomb. Thames & Hudson, London 2007, ISBN 978-0-500-05151-1, p. 27.
- T. G. H. James. Tutanchamun. Der ewige Glanz des jungen Pharaos. Müller, Köln 2000, ISBN 88-8095-545-4, p. 311.
- M. V. Seton-Williams: Tutanchamun. Der Pharao. Das Grab. Der Goldschatz. Ebeling, Luxembourg 1980, ISBN 3-8105-1706-2, pp. 188–189.
