= Alfred Lucas (chemist) =

English chemist and part of Tutankhamun excavation team

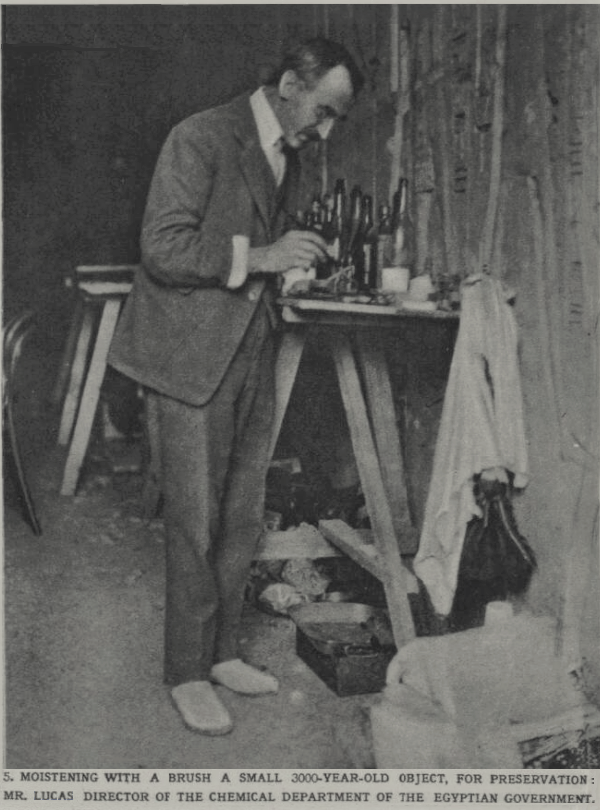
- Lucas working on items from Tutankhamun's tomb, 1923
- Born: 27 August 1867; Chorlton-upon-Medlock, Manchester, England
- Died: 9 December 1945 (aged 78); Luxor, Egypt
- Occupation: Analytical chemist
- Known for: Chemist who conserved artifacts found in Tutankhamun's tomb

Alfred Lucas OBE (27 August 1867 – 9 December 1945) was an Egyptian-based English analytical chemist and archaeologist. He is best known for being part of Howard Carter's team at the excavation of Tutankhamun's tomb, analysing and conserving many of the finds, but he was also a pioneer in the wider fields of artifact preservation and forensic science.

== Life ==
=== Early life ===
Lucas was born in Chorlton-upon-Medlock, Manchester, England, to commercial traveller Joshua Peter Lucas and Sarah (née Thomas). He studied chemistry in London at the Royal School of Mines and the Royal College of Science, before working for eight years as an assistant chemist at the Government Laboratory in London.

=== Career in Egypt ===
Diagnosed with tuberculosis in 1897, Lucas moved to Egypt a year later where he made a complete recovery. Serving as a chemist with the Egyptian civil service, he worked in Egypt for the rest of his career. After starting in the Salt Department, he was employed in a series of chemical laboratory posts, including with the Geological Survey Department, which introduced him to Egypt's ancient monuments, Chief Chemist of the Surveys Department and then Director and Principal Chemist of the Government Analytical Laboratory. In 1923 he planned to retire to pursue his interest in archaeology. He however accepted the position of Consulting Chemist to the Antiquities Service, and later of honorary consulting chemist, which he held until his death in 1945.

Lucas also undertook much forensic science work, developing considerable expertise as a ballistics and handwriting expert. He often gave expert evidence in court, and advised British courts-martial on forensic matters during both world wars. His writings on forensic science were well received and considered ground-breaking, with the English language Egyptian Gazette referring to him as "Egypt's Sherlock Holmes".

=== The tomb of Tutankhamun ===
During his time in Egypt, Lucas developed an expertise in the analysis and preservation of objects recovered from excavated ancient Egyptian sites. When in November 1922 the archaeologist Howard Carter discovered the tomb of Tutankhamun with its contents largely intact, the Egyptian authorities agreed to loan Lucas to the excavation. He commenced work in December 1922, a part of a small team of experienced archaeologists and experts, led by Howard Carter and including Arthur Mace, Arthur Callender and photographer Harry Burton. Lucas played a key role in this team, being responsible for the conservation, restoration and preparation for shipping of the thousands of objects found, some of them quite fragile. To enable him to undertake this work, a makeshift laboratory was set up in the nearby empty tomb of Seti II, with Lucas, assisted by Arthur Mace, assessing, cleaning and – if necessary – repairing each object to ensure safe transport to the Cairo Museum.

Lucas's descriptions of the conservation process were published in several newspapers, including a 1923 article in The Times, where he described the difficulties encountered when preserving objects from the tomb:

Many of the objects are in such a condition that before they are photographed, recorded, packed, or transported to Cairo they must be cleaned, strengthened and repaired. Any error in treatment might ruin them. ... The first thing to do is to remove superficial dust, which may usually be done by means of a small pair of bellows or by gentle brushing with an artist's small, soft, dry bristle. A duster cannot be used, as this might catch in any loose gold and cause damage.

... The nature and properties of all these materials must be analysed. ... What is the best cementing material for refastening loose gold or loose inlay, since a material employed by the Ancient Egyptians in the dry climate of Upper Egypt is not necessarily suitable for the damper climate of museums?

Very little chemical work has been done on many of the problems faced, and of that little a considerable proportion of the results are so scattered in scientific journals that they cannot easily be traced.

Given the heat of the tomb, work was undertaken over the winter, with Lucas spending much of the remainder of his time in Cairo performing chemical analysis and preparing objects for exhibition. Working closely with Howard Carter, Lucas proved to be one of the excavation's most committed supporters, finally spending nine seasons until 1930 working in his on-site laboratory.

=== Later years and achievements ===
After his involvement with Tutankhamun's tomb, Lucas supported a number of other excavations, including serving on a commission to consider the restoration of the neglected Theban tombs.

During the Second World War, he helped in the work to safeguard the objects in the Cairo Museum, and gave lectures and published information booklets for British forces in Egypt. He died, aged 78, at Luxor Hospital on 9 December 1945, during a visit to Luxor, having suffered heart failure. A bachelor, the bulk of his estate was left to his brother and sister and their children.

Lucas published numerous books, papers and articles on his research findings, including subjects relating to the Egypt of his time and the preservation of ancient Egyptian materials, drawing on his work in Tutankhamen's tomb. His books on both artifact conservation and forensic chemistry proved influential and helped develop these fields as professions, some remaining in print many years after his death. Lucas published several articles in the Palestine Exploration Quarterly on biblical topics.

Lucas received a number of honours for his service with the Egyptian government, including the Ottoman Order of Osmanieh fourth class in 1906, appointment as an officer of the Order of the British Empire in 1920 and the Egyptian Order of the Nile third class in 1921.
