= Arthur Callender =

English Egyptologist and engineer (1875–1936)

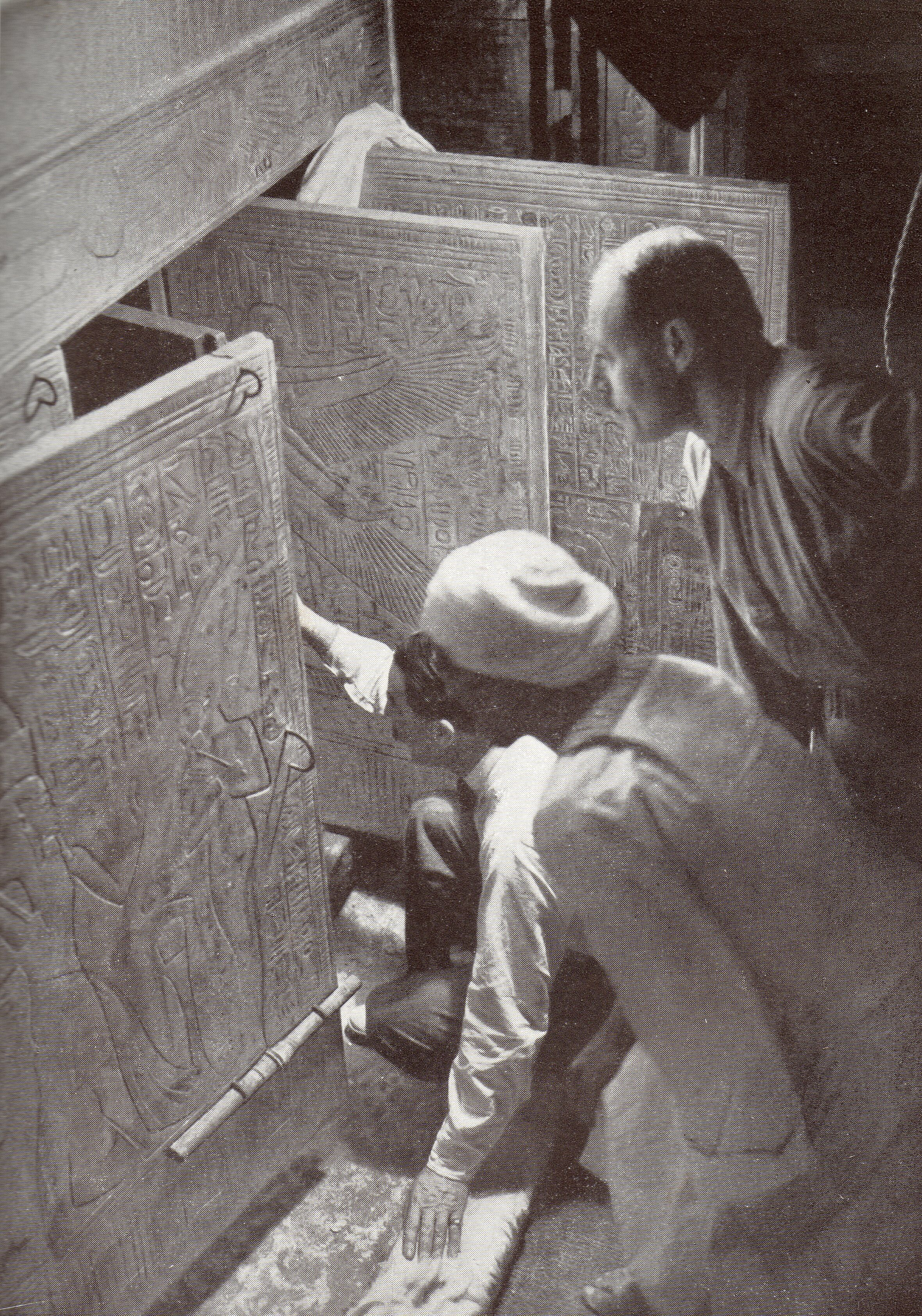
- Opening Tutankhamun's shrine. Callender is on the right of the photo
- Born: Arthur Robert Callender; 13 December 1875; Skirbeck, near Boston, Lincolnshire, England
- Died: 12 December 1936 (aged 60); Alexandria, Egypt
- Occupations: Engineer and Egyptologist
- Known for: Howard Carter's assistant when excavating Tutankhamun's tomb
- Spouse(s): Eliza Clara née Reynolds, (married 1901)

Arthur Robert Callender (13 December 1875 – 12 December 1936), nicknamed Pecky, was an English engineer and archaeologist, best known for his role as assistant to Howard Carter during the excavation of Tutankhamun's tomb in the 1920s.

== Life ==
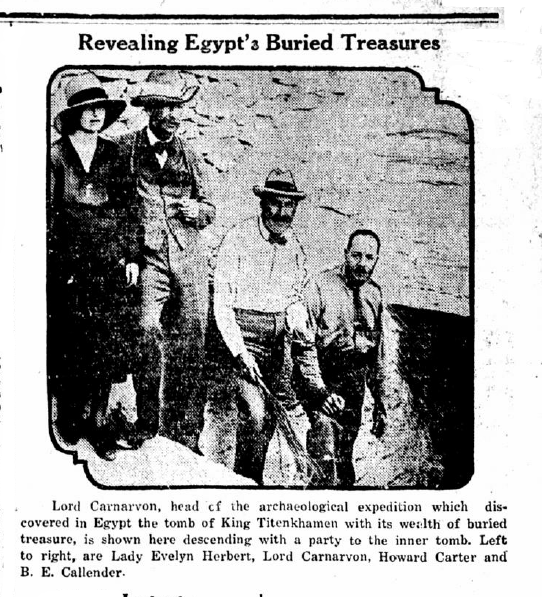
Newspaper photo of (left to right) Lady Evelyn Herbert, Lord Carnarvon, Howard Carter and Callender

Callender was born in Skirbeck, near Boston, Lincolnshire, England, to engineer Robert Callender and Matilda (née Pepper). After training as an engineer he moved to Egypt and worked as a manager with the State Railways. (Note: His older brother Edward already worked for the Egyptian Railways.) In 1911 he was awarded the Ottoman Order of the Medjidieh, fourth class, for his services as Assistant Inspector-General of the Auxiliary Railways of Upper Egypt. He retired from the Railway Service in about 1920.

=== Tutankhamun's tomb ===
During his time in Egypt, Callender took an interest in Egyptology and had been on friendly terms with archaeologist Howard Carter since the 1890s, when both were involved with the Egypt Exploration Fund. In 1920, after retirement, Callender built a house at Armant, Egypt and joined a number of local excavations. This was near the Valley of the Kings, where Carter was employed by Lord Carnarvon in a systematic search for any tombs missed by previous expeditions, in particular that of the Pharaoh Tutankhamun. This search had yet to yield any significant results when, in October 1922, Carter began to excavate beneath the foundations of a row of ancient workman's huts in the heart of the valley. Deciding he would need a reliable assistant if a discovery was made, he visited Callender, who agreed to join Carter's dig at short notice if required. On 4 November Carter's team discovered a flight of steps which, once dug out, revealed a doorway sealed with ancient cartouches, suggesting an intact tomb. Carter ordered the staircase refilled, to await the arrival of his patron Lord Carnarvon, then in England. Meanwhile, Carter contacted Callender, who joined the excavation on 10 November.

Carnarvon, accompanied by his daughter Lady Evelyn Herbert, arrived on 23 November 1922. The next day Carter and Callender supervised the uncovering of the steps, the fully exposed doorway revealing a seal containing Tutankhamun's cartouche. This door was removed and the rubble filled corridor behind cleared, revealing the door of the tomb itself. Callender was present when, on 26 November, Carter made a tiny breach in the top left hand corner of the tomb doorway, enabling him to peer in by the light of a candle. When Carnarvon asked, "Can you see anything?" Carter replied "Yes, wonderful things!". The tomb was then secured, to be entered in the presence of an official of the Egyptian Department of Antiquities the next day. However that night, Callender, Carter, Carnarvon and Lady Evelyn apparently made an unauthorised visit, becoming the first people in modern times to enter the tomb. Some sources suggest that the group also entered the inner burial chamber. (Note: That the group entered the burial chamber is supported by Lucas and Hoving, but dismissed by Carnarvon in The Times, 11 Dec 1922.) In this account, a small hole was found in the chamber's sealed doorway and Carter, Carnarvon and Lady Evelyn crawled through, although Callender was too heavily built to do so.

The next morning, the 27 November, saw an inspection of the tomb in the presence of an Egyptian official. Callender rigged up electric lighting, illuminating a vast haul of items, including gilded couches, chests, thrones, and shrines. They also saw evidence of two further chambers, including the sealed doorway to the inner burial chamber, guarded by two life-size statues of Tutankhamun. In spite of evidence of break-ins in ancient times, the tomb was virtually intact, and would ultimately be found to contain over 5,000 items.

On 29 November the tomb was officially opened in the presence of a number of invited dignitaries and Egyptian officials.

The scale of the task of assessing and clearing the tomb was vast, with Carter obtaining the loan of experienced archaeologists, including Arthur Mace, chemist Alfred Lucas and photographer Harry Burton. Callender's role in the excavation however remained key. Described by one of Carter's biographers as "phlegmatic, unshakable, and remarkably versatile", Callender was able to apply his engineer's experience to problems as they arose. He took charge when Carter was absent during the early days of the excavation, when the risk of theft from the tomb was at its highest. In December 1922, one visitor noted that, while a watchman's hut was being built, Callender stood guard outside the tomb "with a loaded rifle across his knee ... sitting in the gleaming hot sun ... with huge beads of perspiration upon his uncovered and balding head." Once the excavation was fully underway, Callender's responsibilities included setting up the electrical installation for lighting the tomb, organising the transport of materials from the rail station to the tomb site, and assisting in the removal of artifacts. He also dismantled the shrines enclosing Tutankhamun's body and rigged up a pully system to remove the lid of the sarcophagus and the coffins inside. He acted as interpreter for at least one meeting with the director general of the Egyptian Department of Antiquities, Pierre Lacau.

There were clearly tensions in his working relationship with Carter, who noted in his journal on 25 January 1924: "Callender sent in his resignation – blaming my action towards him." Callender however reconsidered, and was still working closely with Carter after December 1925, and into 1926. (Note: Mention of Callender in Minnie Burton's diary confirms his presence in April 1926.)

Callender also worked on other excavations, including assisting Walter Bryan Emery and Robert Mond in reconstructing the tomb of Ramose in 1924, and explorations at Armant in 1935 and 1936. Additionally, he sold artifacts including items to the New York Metropolitan Museum of Art and the Oriental Institute, Chicago.

=== Personal life ===
On 14 August 1901 Callender married Eliza Clara Reynolds in Alexandria, Egypt.

His death probably occurred on 12 December 1936 in Alexandria, aged 60, (Note: Other sources indicate 1937 as Callender's death year.) although the death was never recorded by the Register Office in England, nor was it reported to the British Consulate in Egypt. He died intestate.
