= Arthur Cruttenden Mace =

English archaeologist

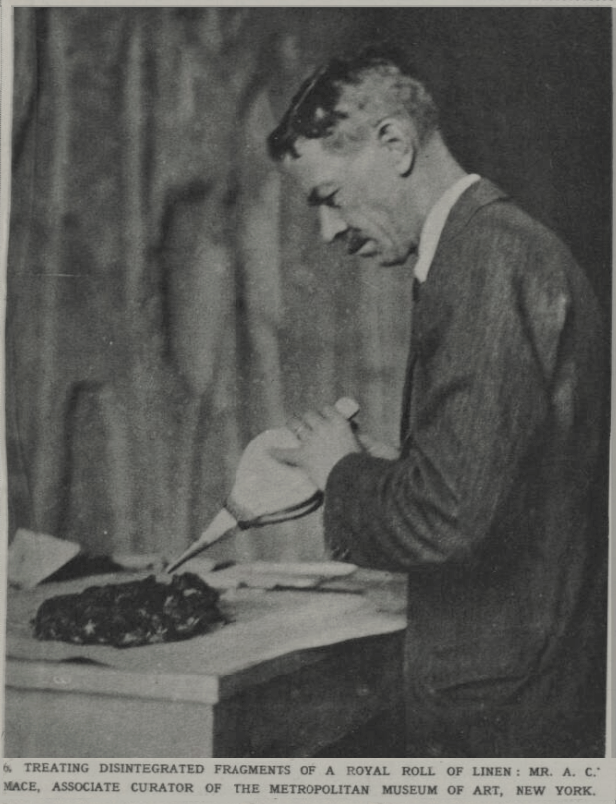
- Mace working on items from Tutankhamun's tomb, 1923
- Born: 17 July 1874; Glenorchy, Tasmania
- Died: 6 April 1928 (aged 53); Haywards Heath, Sussex, England
- Education: Keble College, Oxford
- Occupation: Archaeologist
- Known for: Worked in Egypt for the Metropolitan Museum of Art and on Tutankhamun's tomb
- Relatives: Flinders Petrie, cousin

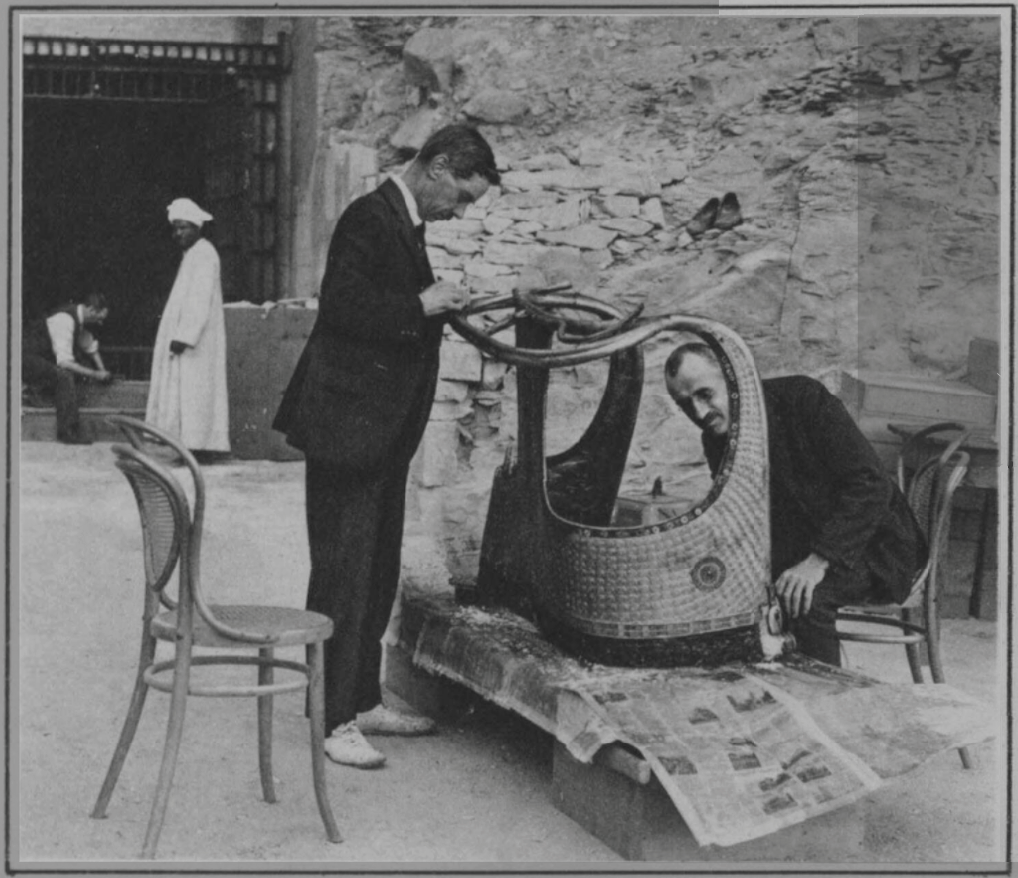
Mace and Alfred Lucas conserve a chariot from Tutankhamun's tomb, December 1923

Arthur Cruttenden Mace (17 July 1874 – 6 April 1928) was a Tasmanian-born English archaeologist and Egyptologist. He is best known for his work for the New York Metropolitan Museum, and as a part of Howard Carter's team during the excavation of Tutankhamun's tomb.

== Biography ==
=== Early life ===
Mace was born on 17 July 1874 in Glenorchy, near Hobart in Tasmania, to Reverend John Cruttenden Mace and Mary Ellen (née Bromby). With his father abroad, much of youth was spent with clergy relatives in East London. He attended St Edward's School, Oxford, and Keble College, Oxford, taking his degree in 1895. His family had close ties with the high church Oxford Movement, and the Church was seen as his likely career. He decided instead to work for his cousin Flinders Petrie, a prominent Egyptologist and pioneer of systematic excavations.

=== Egypt ===
After leaving Oxford, Mace joined Flinders Petrie in Egypt, beginning his archaeological career with the Egypt Exploration Fund, digging at Dendera 1897–98, Hiw 1898–99 and Abydos 1899–1901. From 1901 he worked with George Reisner who was excavating at Giza and Naga el-Deir, before studying at the University of Göttingen in Germany in 1902–03 and then returning to Egypt. In 1906 Mace joined the Metropolitan Museum of Art team at Lisht, northern Egypt, and in 1909 was appointed assistant curator of the Museum in New York, where he helped arrange the Museum's Egyptian Department. Moving back to Egypt in 1912, he worked on the Amenemhat pyramid and the tomb of Senebtisi at Lisht.

In 1915 Mace returned to England, enlisting in the Artists' Rifles Regiment. In February 1917 he was commissioned in the Army Service Corps as a 2nd Lieutenant, serving in the UK and in Genoa, Italy.

After leaving the Army in 1919, Mace went to New York to work on the restoration of Ancient Egyptian artifacts for the Metropolitan Museum, before returning to lead the excavations at Lisht in 1920. He was still working there when, in December 1922, the Metropolitan Museum agreed to loan him to the archaeologist Howard Carter to support the clearance of Tutankhamun's tomb.

=== Tomb of Tutankhamun ===
In November 1922 Howard Carter discovered the tomb of Tutankhamun in the Valley of the Kings near Luxor, its contents largely intact. Given the size and scope of the task in cataloguing and clearing the tomb, Carter sought help from Albert Lythgoe of the Metropolitan Museum's Egyptian excavation team, who readily agreed to the loan of a number of his staff, including Mace.

Arriving on 25 December 1922, Mace was a part of a small team of experienced archaeologists and experts, led by Carter and including Alfred Lucas, Arthur Callender and photographer Harry Burton.

Mace had become an expert in the preservation of fragile materials, and his principal role, together with Alfred Lucas, was to treat each of the objects found, some of them quite fragile, including cleaning and preliminary repairs before shipment to the Cairo Museum. To undertake this work, they established a makeshift laboratory in the empty tomb of Seti II located close to Tutankhamen's tomb. Conditions in the tomb were cramped and extremely hot, with Mace and Lucas working long hours to keep pace with the items removed from Tutankhamun's tomb.

In addition to his conservation work, Mace gave the excavation broader support. He was one of Carter's closer companions and confidants, co-writing with Carter the first volume of the popular account of the excavation, The tomb of Tut Ankh Amen. When required he assisted in the work within Tutankhamun's tomb, including helping Carter remove the shroud from Tutankhamen's body. He also played an important role in reporting and advising during Carter's legal dispute with the Egyptian authorities, that led to the temporary closure of the tomb in 1924.

Due to the heat, work was undertaken each winter. Mace worked on the clearance for two winter seasons, before leaving both Carter's team, and Egypt, for health reasons in the spring of 1924.

=== Personal life ===
In 1907 Mace married Winifred Blyth, they had two daughters, Margaret and Anne. During the Tutankhamun excavation they lived with Mace near the site, Winifred arriving with her grand piano strapped on the back of a camel.

During his final years in Egypt, Mace had suffered from pleurisy, which led to pneumonia. He was unable to continue his Egyptological work, and left the excavation team in 1924. Spending the next four winters in England and the French Riviera, Mace died on 6 April 1928 at a nursing home in Haywards Heath, Sussex. Winifred and her daughter Margaret kept in touch with Howard Carter, visiting him in his Kensington flat during the 1930s. In 1937 Margaret married organist and composer Robin Orr.
