= Albert Lythgoe =

American Egyptologist and archaeologist

Albert Morton Lythgoe
- Lythgoe in Egypt, probably at Lisht c. 1909
- Born: March 15, 1868; Providence, Rhode Island, United States
- Died: January 29, 1934 (aged 65); New York
- Resting place: Swan Point Cemetery
- Education: Harvard University
- Occupations: Egyptologist and archeologist
- Known for: Curator for Metropolitan Museum. Helped resource Tutankhamun's tomb excavation

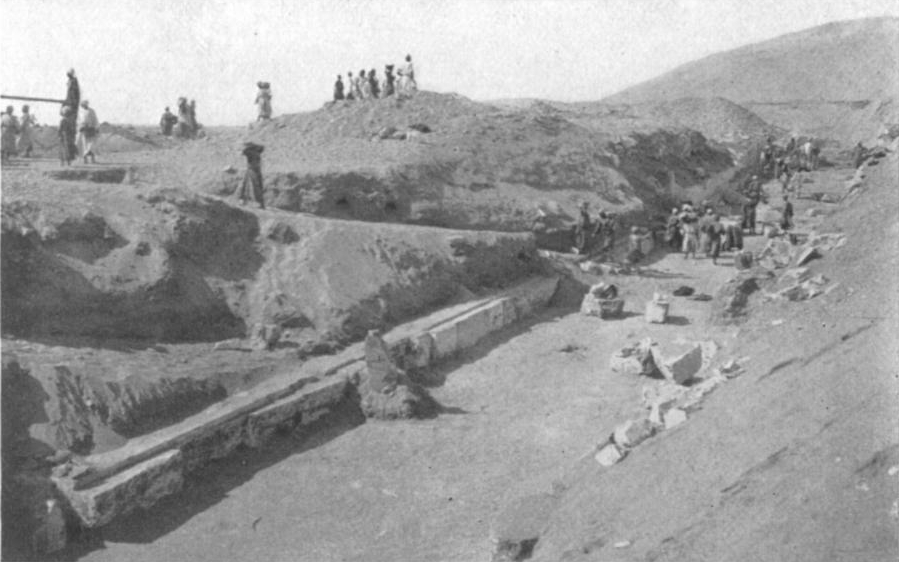
Excavation at Lisht 1908–09, which Lythgoe supervised

Albert Morton Lythgoe (March 15, 1868 – January 29, 1934) was an American archaeologist and Egyptologist. He is best known for his work for the New York Metropolitan Museum of Art, and for the support he gave to the excavation of Tutankhamun's tomb, he releasing several key Metropolitan Museum staff to assist Howard Carter.

== Biography ==
=== Early life ===
Lythgoe was born on March 15, 1868, in Providence, Rhode Island, the son of Joseph Lythgoe and Mary Ellen (née Howarth). He went to Providence Classical High School before attending Harvard University from 1888, graduating in 1892 and receiving his master's degree in 1897. He then studied at the University of Bonn, and lectured on Egyptology at Harvard 1898–99.

=== Career ===
In 1899 Lythgoe went to Egypt to undertake archaeological work, assisting George Reisner in the Hearst Expedition at Naga ed-Der, 1899–1904. He was appointed the first curator of Egyptian Art at the Museum of Fine Arts, Boston, 1902–06, and again lectured at Harvard, 1904–06.

In 1906 Lythgoe resigned from both his Harvard and Boston Museum posts to become the first curator of Egyptian Art at the Metropolitan Museum, New York. He directed a number of Egyptian excavations for the Metropolitan Museum, employing his former Harvard student Herbert Winlock. This included digs at the cemeteries at Lisht 2006–14 and at Deir el-Bahari, near Luxor, after 1918. As curator, he was also responsible for the arrangement of the Metropolitan Museum's Egyptian Collection in New York, which won praise from other Egyptologists.

=== Tomb of Tutankhamun ===
In November 1922 the British Archeologist Howard Carter discovered the tomb of Tutankhamun in the Valley of the Kings near Luxor, a unique find of a pharaonic tomb with its contents largely intact. On hearing of the discovery Lythgoe, who was working at the Metropolitan's nearby Deir al Bahari excavation, sent a congratulatory telegram to Carter. Carter later wrote:

In my reply [to Lythgoe] I somewhat diffidently inquired whether it would be possible — for the immediate emergency at any rate — to secure the assistance of Mr Harry Burton, their photographic expert. [Lythgoe] promptly cabled back, and his cable ought to go on record as an example of disinterested scientific cooperation: 'Only too delighted to assist in any possible way. Please call on Burton and any other members of our staff.

With Lythgoe's support, the Metropolitan Museum loaned a number of experienced staff, including Harry Burton and archeologist Arthur Mace, who both remained loaned to Carter for a number of years. This was a significant contribution to the Tutankhamun exploration, since Carter's initial resources were clearly insufficient for the task of systematically clearing the tomb.

Lythgoe, although never a part of Carter's team, continued to be supportive of Carter and the excavation. He attended the opening of the burial chamber in February 1923, and when Carter and his patron Lord Carnarvon sold exclusive reporting rights to The Times, a deeply unpopular move with the rest of the world's press, Lythgoe wrote to Edward Robinson, the Metropolitan's director, that 'although we are doing the lion's share of the work, the tomb is Carnarvon's and Carter's and the right to speak publicly of it ... is solely theirs'. This support continued during Carter's 1924 legal dispute with Pierre Lacau, head of the Egyptian Antiquities Department, with Lythgoe attending a number of Carter's meetings with Lacau, and offering Carter advice. He also signed two joint letters: one to Lacau saying that Carter was 'conducting his complex and very difficult task in a manner beyond all praise'; and one to The Times, blaming the impasse on Lacau's 'intransigence and his department's bureaucratic policies'.

While the Metropolitan Museum was never formally compensated for the support they gave to the excavation when the late Lord Carnarvon's private Egyptian collection was sold, Lady Carnarvon accepted Carter's advice to sell much of the collection to the Metropolitan Museum. Carter, with Lythgoe representing the Museum, agreed to what appeared to be a low price, thereby providing the museum with some recompense. Philanthropist Edward Harkness funded the purchase. Lythgoe was married to Edward's wife Mary's cousin. Although officially all artifacts from Tutankhamun's tomb went to the Cairo Museum, it is possible that some items were added to the Carnarvon collection and were, therefore, passed on to the Metropolitan Museum in New York.

=== Later life ===
Lythgoe retired as curator of Egyptian Art at the Metropolitan Museum in 1929, and was succeeded by Herbert Winlock. Lythgoe remained as curator emeritus until 1933.

After three years of illness, Lythgoe died in New York on January 29, 1934, aged 65. He is buried at Swan Point Cemetery in Providence, Rhode Island.

Lythgoe married Lucy Tappan Richardson in Athens, Greece, in December 1902. Lucy outlived her husband and died in a nursing home at Killingly, Connecticut, on August 9, 1973, aged 94. She often traveled with her husband on archeological expeditions, and was present in Egypt during the Tutankhamun excavation.
