= Harry Burton (Egyptologist) =

English photographer (1879–1940)

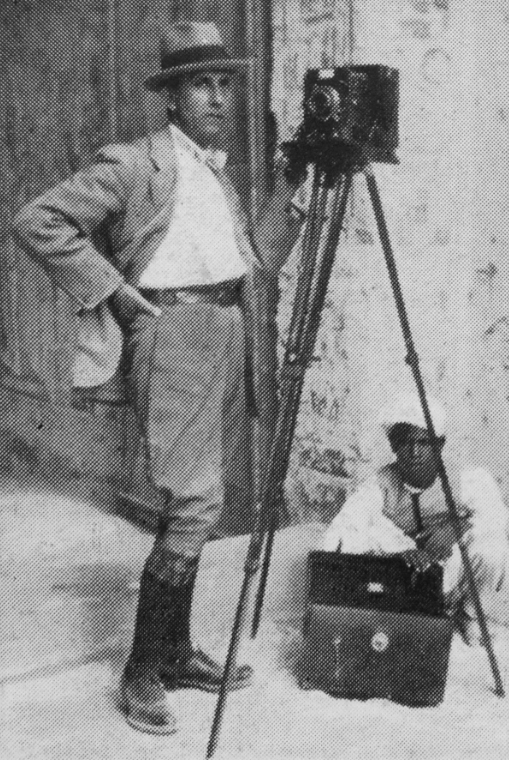
- Burton outside an Egyptian tomb, 1923
- Born: 13 September 1879; Stamford, Lincolnshire, England
- Died: 27 June 1940 (aged 60); Asyut, Egypt
- Occupations: Photographer and Egyptologist
- Known for: Archaeological photography, notably of Tutankhamun's tomb
- Spouse(s): Minnie Catherine née Duckett, (married 1914)
- Children: None

Harry Burton (13 September 1879 – 27 June 1940) was an English archaeological photographer, best known for his photographs of excavations in Egypt's Valley of the Kings. Today, he is sometimes referred to as an Egyptologist, since he worked for the Egyptian Expedition of the Metropolitan Museum of Art for around 25 years, from 1915 until his death. His most famous photographs are the estimated 3,400 or more images that he took documenting Howard Carter's excavation of Tutankhamun's tomb from 1922 to 1932.

== Early life ==
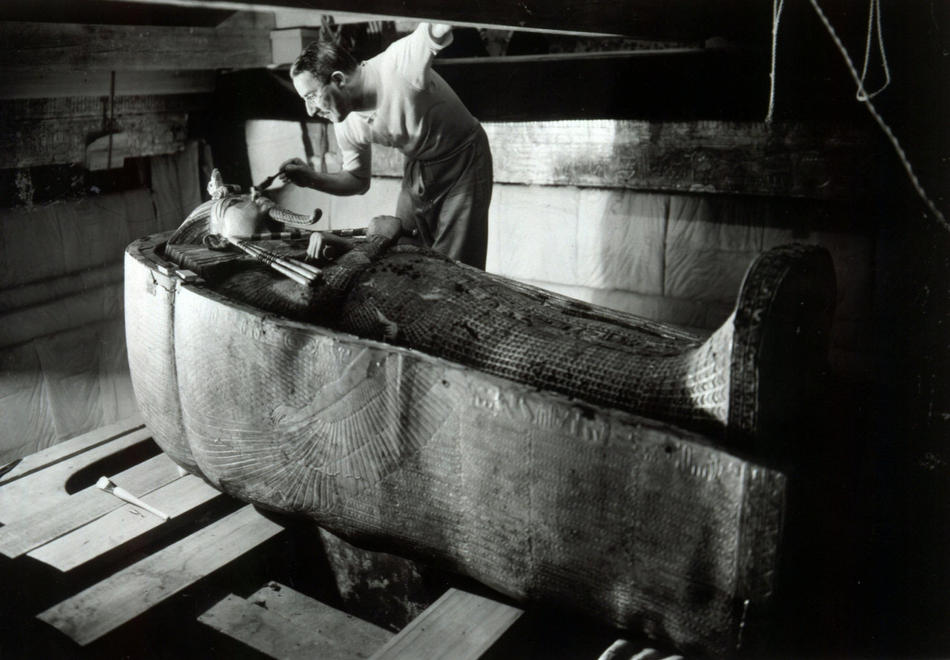
Howard Carter in Tutankhamun's tomb, photographed by Harry Burton

Burton was born in Stamford, Lincolnshire, England, to journeyman cabinet maker William Burton and Ann Hufton, the fifth of eleven children.

== Career ==
In his teens, he began to work for the art historian Robert Henry Hobart Cust and in 1896 moved to Florence, Italy, acting as Cust's secretary and establishing a reputation as an art photographer.

While in Florence, Burton met Theodore M. Davis, a wealthy American lawyer who sponsored a number of excavations of ancient tombs in Egypt. When in 1910 Cust returned to England, Burton went to Egypt, where Davis employed him as a photographer to record his excavations, including the artefacts found. Burton also supervised a number of tomb excavations and clearances, including KV3 and KV47 in 1912, and KV7 in 1913–14.

When Davis relinquished his excavation permit in 1914, Burton was engaged by the Metropolitan Museum of Art's Egyptian Expedition to serve as their official photographer, often working closely with Herbert E. Winlock. Over the next few years, Burton worked with the Metropolitan team on numerous excavations, mostly around Thebes. His photographs frequently appeared in the Bulletin of the Metropolitan Museum of Art and other publications, although they were often not credited.

=== Tutankhamun's tomb ===
In November 1922, Howard Carter discovered the tomb of Tutankhamun, its contents largely intact. Carter realised that "the first and pressing need was for photography, for nothing could be touched until a complete photographic record had been made, a task involving technical skill of the highest order." The Metropolitan Museum's excavation team, working nearby, readily agreed to Carter's request for the loan of Burton to formally photograph the findings of the British excavation at Tutankhamun's tomb.

Taking his first pictures on 27 December 1922, Burton was to spend nearly ten years photographing Tutankhamun's tomb and its artefacts, with more than 3,400 photographs preserved. Burton used gelatine silver glass plates that recorded a high-quality detailed image. For lighting he preferred sunlight reflected into the tomb by mirrors, sometimes over a distance of 100 feet, the light caught by reflectors that were kept constantly in motion to disperse the light evenly on the subject. Burton also made use of two movable powerful electric standard lamps that Carter had installed in the dark tomb, producing an even light that could produce a high quality photograph on a slow exposure. To develop pictures in the first two seasons, Burton used a previously cleared tomb nearby, allowing him to determine whether or not he had the shot required. Carter commented "These periodic dashes of his from tomb to tomb must have been a godsend to the crowd of curious visitors who kept vigil above the tomb, for there were many days during the winter in which it was the only excitement they had." Burton also made use of early colour autochrome plates in his work at the tomb and for the Metropolitan Museum of Art's recording work; the Illustrated London News published some tinted photographic images based on his Tutankhamun autochromes, which were transparencies designed to be viewed against the light.

In addition, Burton learned to operate a motion picture camera, loaned by Samuel Goldwyn Productions, using it to record the opening of Tutankhamun sarcophagus in February 1924, and to show objects as they were being removed from the tomb. He also produced some of the earliest documentary film footage of life in the Nile valley.

While working on Tutankhamun's tomb, Burton continued to do photographic work for the Metropolitan Museum's concession at nearby Deir el-Bahari, this taking up much of his time from 1927. He however continued to support Carter until the completion of the Tutankhamun clearance in 1932, the two remaining on good terms.

=== Later work ===
From 1931 to 1934, Burton worked at the Metropolitan concession further down the Nile at Lisht. He remained in Egypt after the Metropolitan Museum ceased its major excavations in 1935, and continued to record other monuments and artefacts.

In 1931, Carter named Burton as an executor of his will. After Carter died in March 1939, Burton identified at least eighteen items in Carter's antiquities collection taken from Tutankhamun's tomb without authorisation. As this was a sensitive matter that could affect Anglo-Egyptian relations, Burton sought wider advice, finally recommending that the items be discreetly presented or sold to the Metropolitan Museum of Art, with most eventually going either there or to the Egyptian Museum in Cairo. The Metropolitan Museum items were later returned to Egypt.

== Personal life ==
On 18 July 1914, Burton married Minnie Catherine Young at Chelsea Registry Office in London. When not in Egypt, they lived mainly in Florence, where they were often visited by Howard Carter.

From 1937, Burton's health began to decline. He died of diabetes in Egypt on 27 June 1940, aged 60. He was buried in the American cemetery in Asyut.

Minnie outlived her husband, dying in Florence in May 1957. The couple had no children.

== Legacy ==
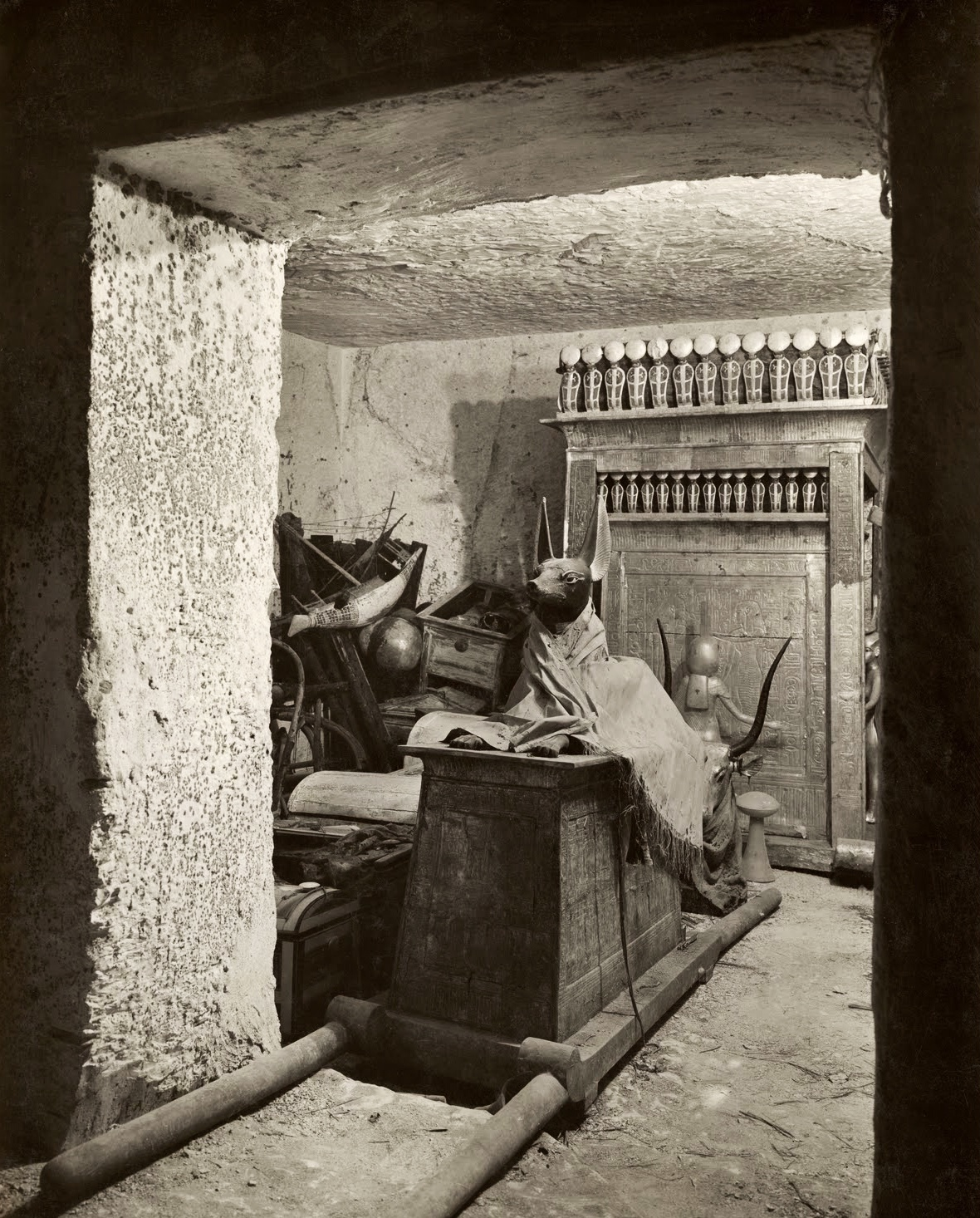
The Anubis Shrine in situ at the entrance of the Treasury, as photographed by Burton

While the 3,400 images from the tomb of Tutankhamun are widely known, and played a significant part in the "Egyptomania" of the 1920s, Burton also produced many other photographic records of the highest quality, including 7,500 for the Metropolitan Museum, more than 3,000 of Theban tombs and monuments and 600 of antiquities in Cairo and Italy.

Burton's key role in photographing archaeological finds, including those relating to Tutankhamun, was often downplayed or overlooked. His pictures were frequently published without attribution, he rarely featured in press reports, with only brief mentions in contemporary books. He however earned a reputation among Egyptologists as the finest archaeological photographer of the time. Carter valued his work highly, describing his photographs as "of outstanding beauty as well as great archaeological value". In May 1923, Carter wrote to Albert Lythgoe, who had agreed the loan of Burton from the Metropolitan concession, confirming that Burton had completed his work "in a splendid and admirable manner. In fact, I do not know how to praise his work sufficiently. He had a colossal task which he carried out to the end in the most efficient manner possible, and I should like to convey through you my most sincere gratitude to your trustees and Director for his good aid."

Burton's photographs have featured in a number of exhibitions:

- 2001: The Pharaoh's Photographer: Harry Burton, Tutankhamun, and the Metropolitan's Egyptian Expedition, at the Metropolitan Museum of Art;
- 2006: Wonderful Things! The Discovery of the Tomb of Tutankhamun: The Harry Burton Photographs, at the University of Chicago's Oriental Institute;
- 2006–07: Discovering Tutankhamun: The Photographs of Harry Burton, at the Metropolitan Museum of Art;
- 2014: Discovering Tutankhamun, at the Ashmolean Museum, Oxford, featured many of Burton's original photographs alongside records and drawings from the Griffith Institute;
- 2017–2018: Photographing Tutankhamun, at the Museum of Archaeology and Anthropology, University of Cambridge, showed many of Harry Burton's photographs. Held also at The Collection, Lincoln, it was curated by Professor Christina Riggs.
