= Mask of Tutankhamun =

Gold mask of Egyptian pharaoh

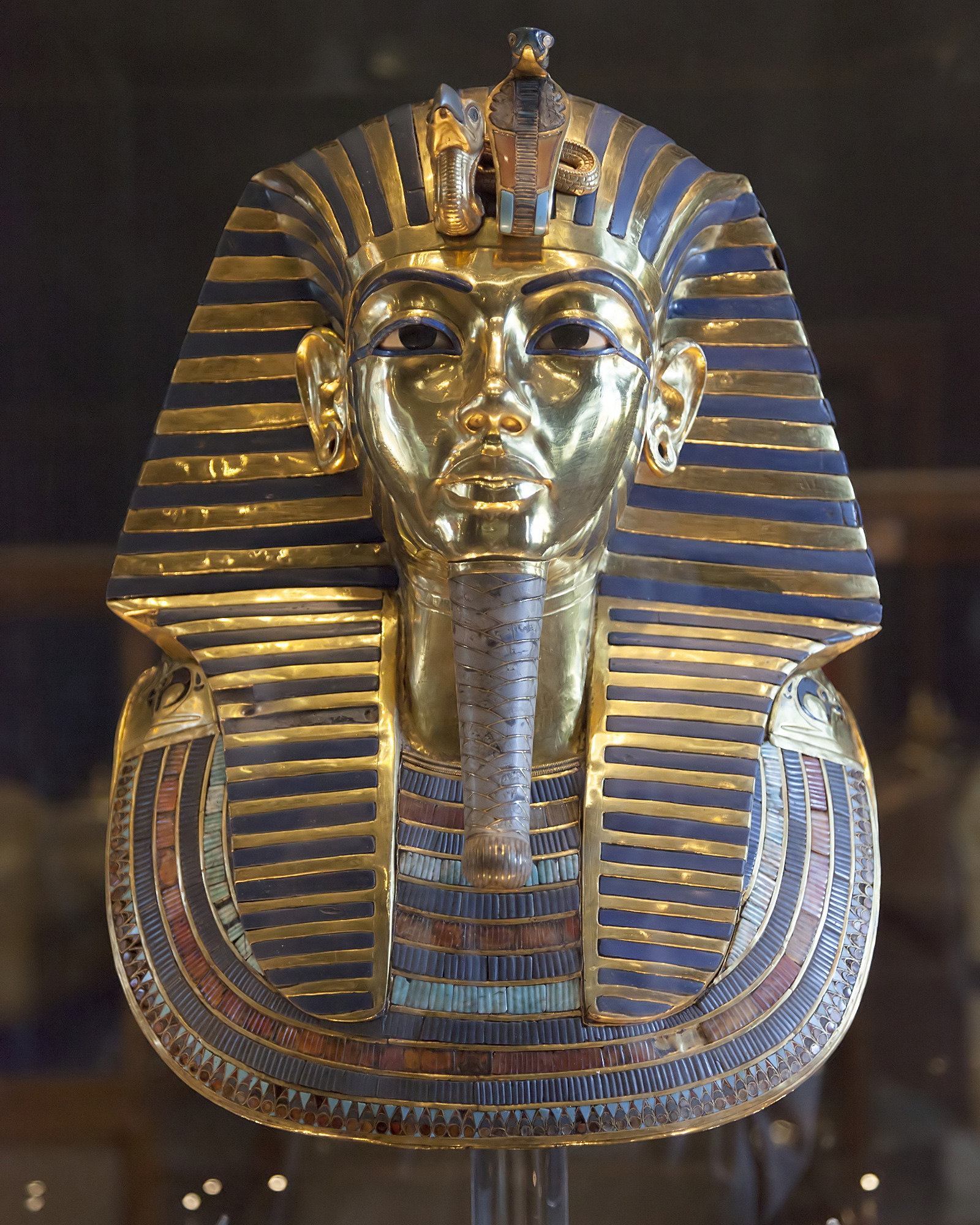
- Type: Death mask
- Material: Gold, lapis lazuli, carnelian, obsidian, turquoise, and glass paste
- Size: 54 cm × 39.3 cm × 49 cm (21.3 in × 15.5 in × 19.3 in)
- Created: c. 1323 BC
- Discovered: 28 October 1925
- Discovered by: Howard Carter; Hussein Abdul Rasoul
- Place: Tomb of Tutankhamun at the Valley of the Kings
- Present location: Grand Egyptian Museum
- Identification: Carter no. 256a; Journal d'Entrée no. 60672; Exhibition no. 220
- Language: Egyptian (via inscribed hieroglyphics)
- Period: Dynasty XVIII of the New Kingdom
- Culture: Ancient Egypt

The mask of Tutankhamun is a gold funerary mask that belonged to Tutankhamun, who reigned over the New Kingdom of Egypt from 1332 BC to 1323 BC, during the Eighteenth Dynasty. After being buried with Tutankhamun's mummy for over 3,000 years, it was found in 1922 following the discovery of Tutankhamun's tomb three years earlier by the British archaeologist Howard Carter at the Valley of the Kings. It is on public display at the Grand Egyptian Museum in Cairo.

Bearing the likeness of Tutankhamun in the form of Osiris, the Egyptian god of the afterlife, the mask is 54 centimetres (21.3 in) tall, weighs over 10 kilograms (22 lb) or 321.5 troy ounces, and is decorated with semi-precious stones. A spell from the Book of the Dead is inscribed in Egyptian hieroglyphs on its shoulders. In 2015, it was restored after its 2.5-kilogram (5.5 lb) plaited beard fell off and was hastily glued back on by museum workers.

According to the British Egyptologist and archaeologist Nicholas Reeves, the mask is "not only the quintessential image from Tutankhamun's tomb, it is perhaps the best-known object from ancient Egypt itself." Since 2001, some Egyptologists have suggested that it may originally have been intended for Neferneferuaten, a female pharaoh who reigned near the end of the Amarna Period.

== Discovery ==
Tutankhamun's burial chamber was found at the Theban Necropolis in the Valley of the Kings in 1922 and opened in 1923. It would be another two years before the excavation team, led by the English archaeologist Howard Carter, was able to open the heavy sarcophagus containing Tutankhamun's mummy. On 28 October 1925, they opened the innermost of three coffins to reveal the gold mask, seen for the first time in around 3,250 years. Carter wrote in his diary:

The pins removed, the lid was raised. The penultimate scene was disclosed – a very neatly wrapped mummy of the young king, with golden mask of sad but tranquil expression, symbolizing Osiris ... the mask bears that god's attributes, but the likeness is that of Tut.Ankh.Amen – placid and beautiful, with the same features as we find upon his statues and coffins. The mask has fallen slightly back, thus its gaze is straight up to the heavens.

In December 1925 the mask was removed from the tomb and transported 635 kilometres (395 mi) to the Egyptian Museum in Cairo.

== Design and composition ==
The mask is 54 cm (21 in) tall, 39.3 cm (15.5 in) wide and 49 cm (19 in) deep. It is fashioned from two layers of fine gold, varying from 1.5–3 mm (0.059–0.118 in) in thickness, and weighing 10.23 kg (22.6 lb). X-ray crystallography conducted in 2007 revealed that the mask is primarily made of 23 karat gold, alloyed with copper to facilitate the cold working used to shape the mask. The surface of the mask is covered in a very thin layer (around 30 nanometres) of two different alloys of gold: a lighter 18.4 karat shade for the face and neck, and 22.5 karat gold for the rest of the mask.

The face represents the pharaoh's standard image, and the same image was found by excavators elsewhere in the tomb, in particular in the guardian statues. He wears a nemes headcloth, topped by the royal insignia of a cobra (Wadjet, viewer's right) and vulture (Nekhbet, viewer's left), symbolising Tutankhamun's rule of both Lower Egypt and Upper Egypt respectively. The blue stripes on the headcloth are glass.

The ears are pierced to hold earrings, a feature that appears to have been reserved for queens and children in almost all surviving ancient Egyptian works of art. However, the Egyptologist Zahi Hawass, a former Egyptian Minister of Antiquities, told Al-Monitor that the "theory about the ear piercing is unfounded because all the 18th Dynasty's rulers wore earrings during their period of rule."

The mask is inlaid with coloured glass and gemstones, including lapis lazuli (the eye surrounds and eyebrows), quartz (the eyes), obsidian (the pupils), carnelian, amazonite, turquoise, and faience.

=== Beard ===
When it was discovered in 1925, the 2.5 kg (5.5 lb) narrow gold beard, inlaid with blue glass, giving it a plaited effect, had become separated from the mask, but it was reattached to the chin using a wooden dowel in 1944.

External videos
- News report on the 2015 restoration work (in English)

In August 2014, the beard accidentally became detached from the mask when it was taken out of its display case for cleaning. The museum workers responsible used quick-drying epoxy in an attempt to fix it, leaving the beard off-center. The damage was noticed in January 2015 and has been repaired by a German–Egyptian team who reattached it using beeswax, a natural material used by the ancient Egyptians.

In January 2016, it was announced that eight employees of the Egyptian Museum were fined and faced discipline for allegedly ignoring scientific and professional methods of restoration and causing permanent damage to the mask. A former director of the museum and a former director of restoration were among those facing discipline.

=== Inscription ===
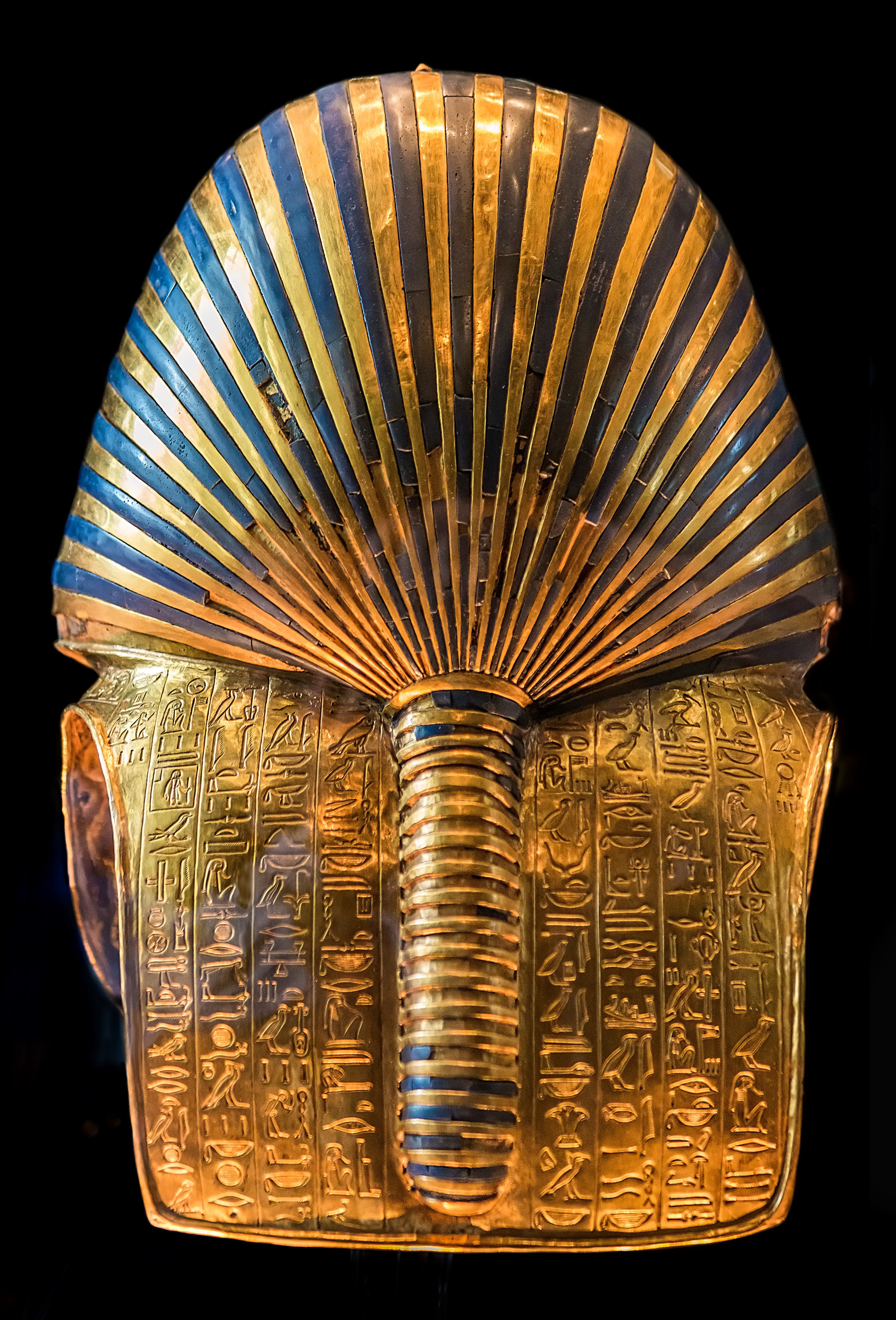
Back of the mask

A protective spell is inscribed with Egyptian hieroglyphs on the back and shoulders in ten vertical and two horizontal lines. The spell first appeared on masks in the Middle Kingdom, 500 years before Tutankhamun, and was used in Chapter 151 of the Book of the Dead.

Thy right eye is the night bark (of the sun-god), thy left eye is the day-bark, thy eyebrows are (those of) the Ennead of the Gods, thy forehead is (that of) Anubis, the nape of thy neck is (that of) Horus, thy locks of hair are (those of) Ptah-Sokar. (Thou art) in front of the Osiris (Tutankhamun). He sees thanks to thee, thou guidest him to the goodly ways, thou smitest for him the confederates of Seth so that he may overthrow thine enemies before the Ennead of the Gods in the great Castle of the Prince, which is in Heliopolis ... the Osiris, the King of Upper Egypt Nebkheperure [Tutankhamun's throne-name], deceased, given life by Re.

Osiris was the Egyptian god of the afterlife. Ancient Egyptians believed that kings preserved in the likeness of Osiris would rule the Kingdom of the Dead. It never totally replaced the older cult of the sun, in which dead kings were thought to be reanimated as the sun-god Re, whose body was made of gold and lapis lazuli. This confluence of old and new beliefs resulted in a mixture of emblems inside Tutankhamun's sarcophagus and tomb.

=== Bead necklace ===
Although it is usually removed when the mask is on display, it has a triple-string necklace of gold and blue faience disc-beads with lotus flower terminals and uraeus clasps.

== Gallery ==
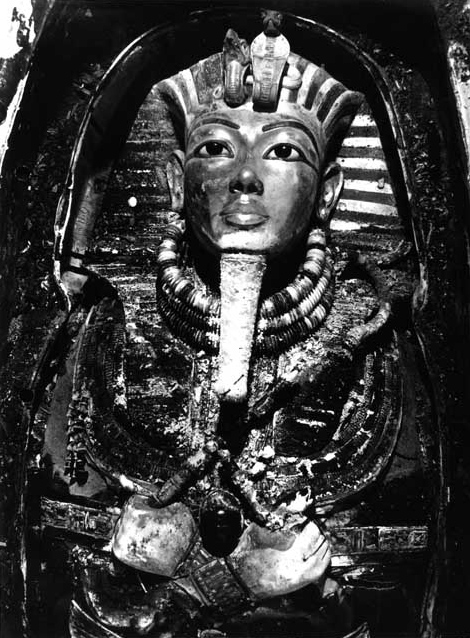
The gold mask in situ, 1925

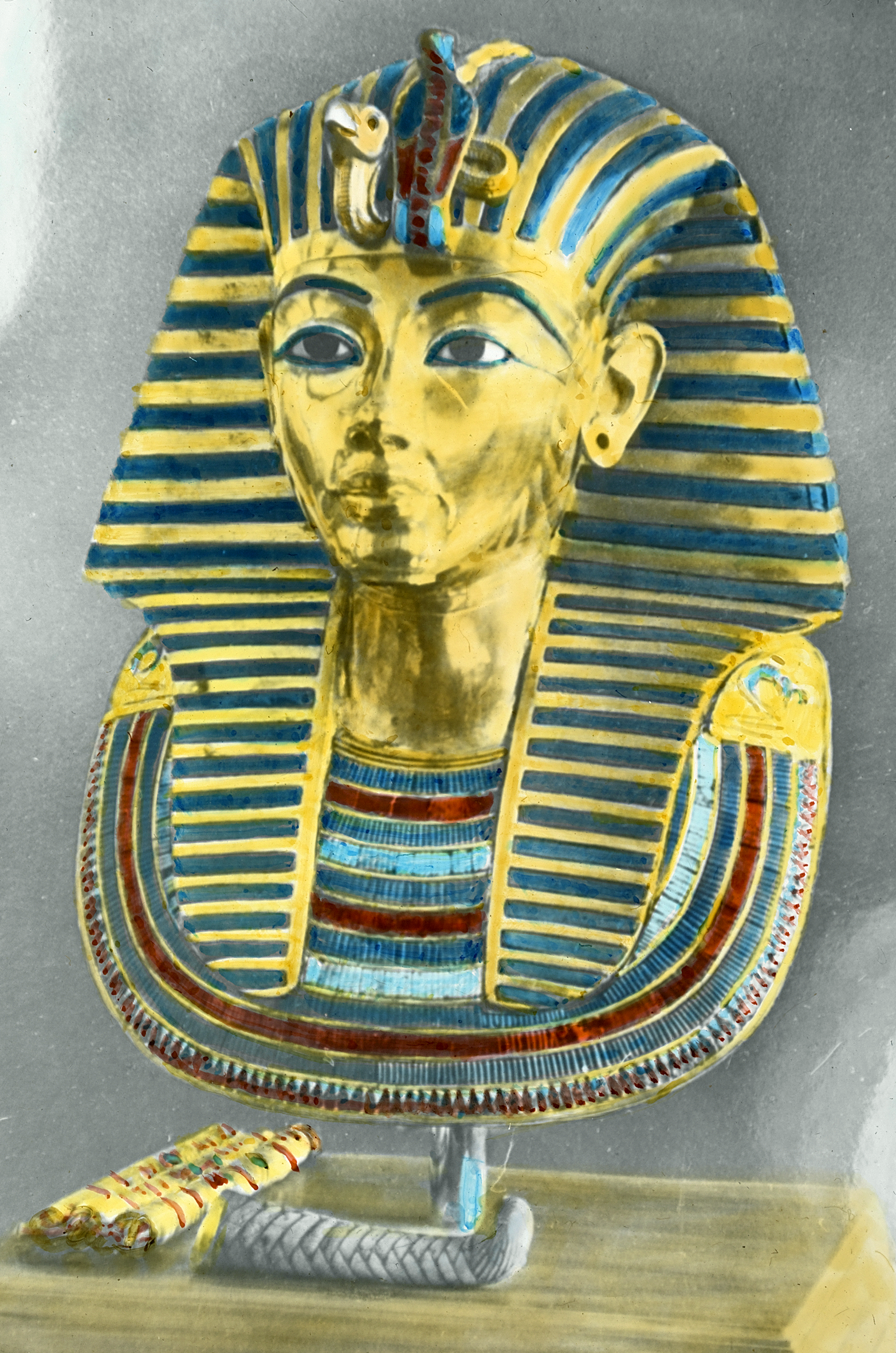
The mask on display at the Cairo Museum with the necklace and beard placed separately, c. 1938

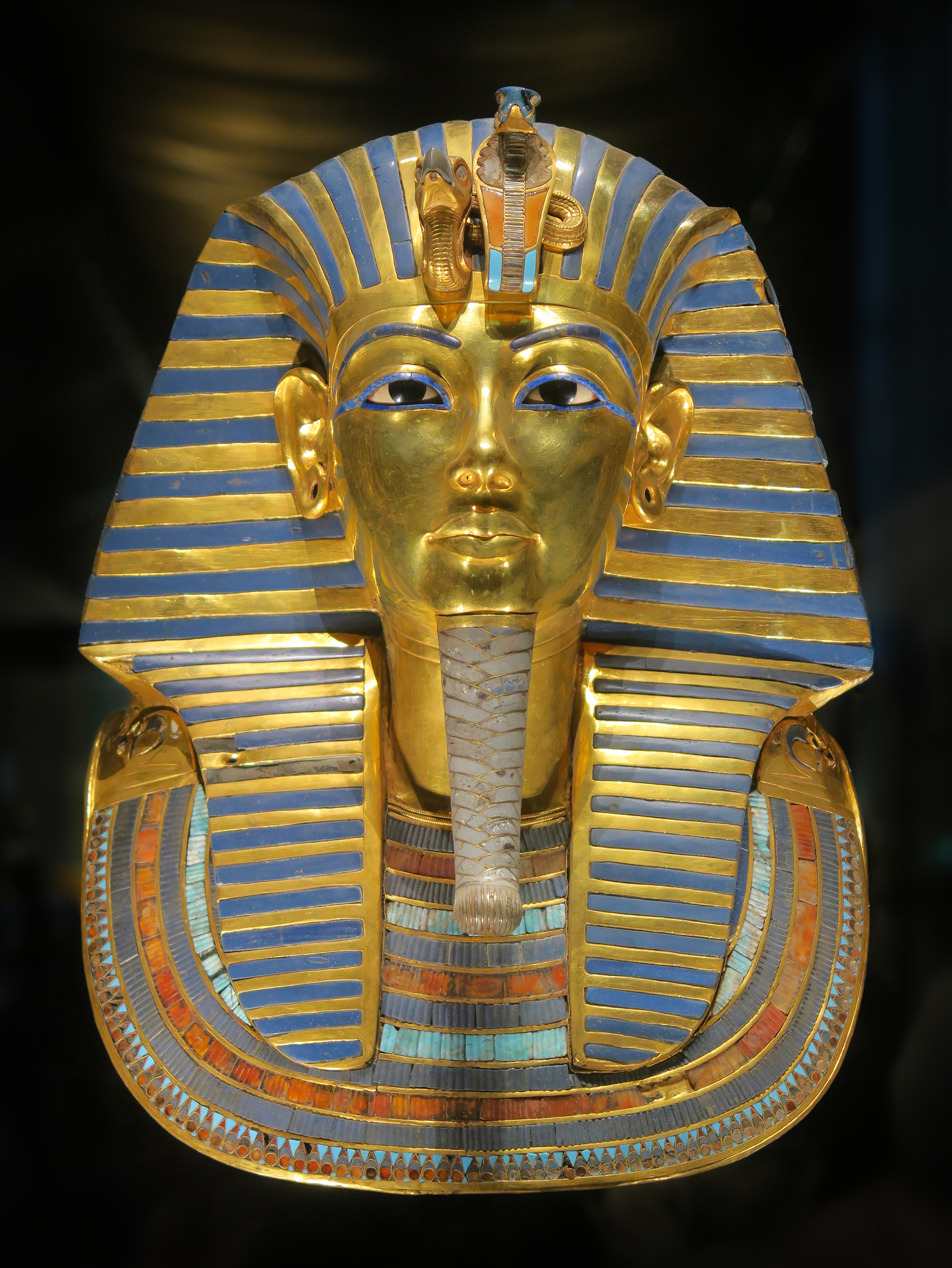
The mask on display at the Grand Egyptian Museum, 2026

== Possible alteration and reuse ==
Several of the objects in Tutankhamun's tomb are thought to have been adapted for Tutankhamun's use after originally being made for either of two pharaohs whose short reigns preceded his: Neferneferuaten, who was possibly Nefertiti, and Smenkhkare. Egyptologist Nicholas Reeves argues that the mask was one of these objects. He says that the pierced ears indicate that the mask was intended for a female pharaoh, which Neferneferuaten was; that the slightly different composition of the underlying alloy of the face (23.2 karats) suggests it was made independently from the rest of the mask (23.5 karat alloy); and that the cartouches on the mask show signs of being altered from Neferneferuaten's name to Tutankhamun's.

Reeves argues that the nemes-headcloth, collar, and ears of the mask were made for Neferneferuaten but that the face, which was made as a separate piece of metal and matches other portrayals of Tutankhamun, was added later, replacing an original face that presumably represented Neferneferuaten. However, Christian Eckmann, the metal conservation expert who carried out the restoration in 2015, says there are no signs that the face is composed of a different gold than the rest of the mask or that the cartouches have been altered.

== See also ==
- Exhibitions of artifacts from the tomb of Tutankhamun

== Bibliography ==
- Broschat, Katja; Eckmann, Christian (2022). Tutanchamuns Mumienmaske – Chronographie einer Ikone. Monographien des Römisch-Germanischen Zentralmuseums, vol. 162. Mainz: Römisch-Germanisches Zentralmuseum, ISBN 978-3-88467-356-0 (monographical study on the scientific and technical aspects of the mask).
- Reeves, Nicholas (2015). "Tutankhamun's Mask Reconsidered". In Oppenheim, Adela; Goelet, Ogden (eds.). Bulletin of the Egyptological Seminar. Vol. 19. Egyptological Seminar of New York. ISBN 978-0-9816120-2-7.
