= Hussein Abdul Rasoul =

One of the finders of Tutankhamun's tomb

- حسين عبد الرسول
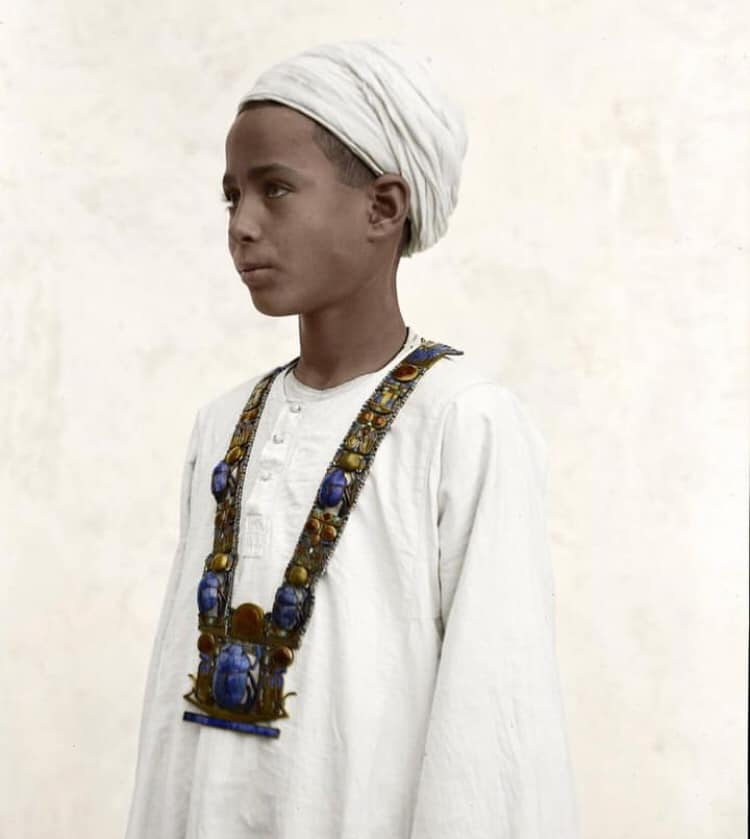
- Hussein wearing Tutankhamun's necklace (12 years old)
- Born: c. 1910; Kurna, Luxor
- Died: 1997 (aged 86–87); Kurna, Luxor
- Citizenship: Egypt
- Known for: Discovery of the tomb of Tutankhamun in 1922

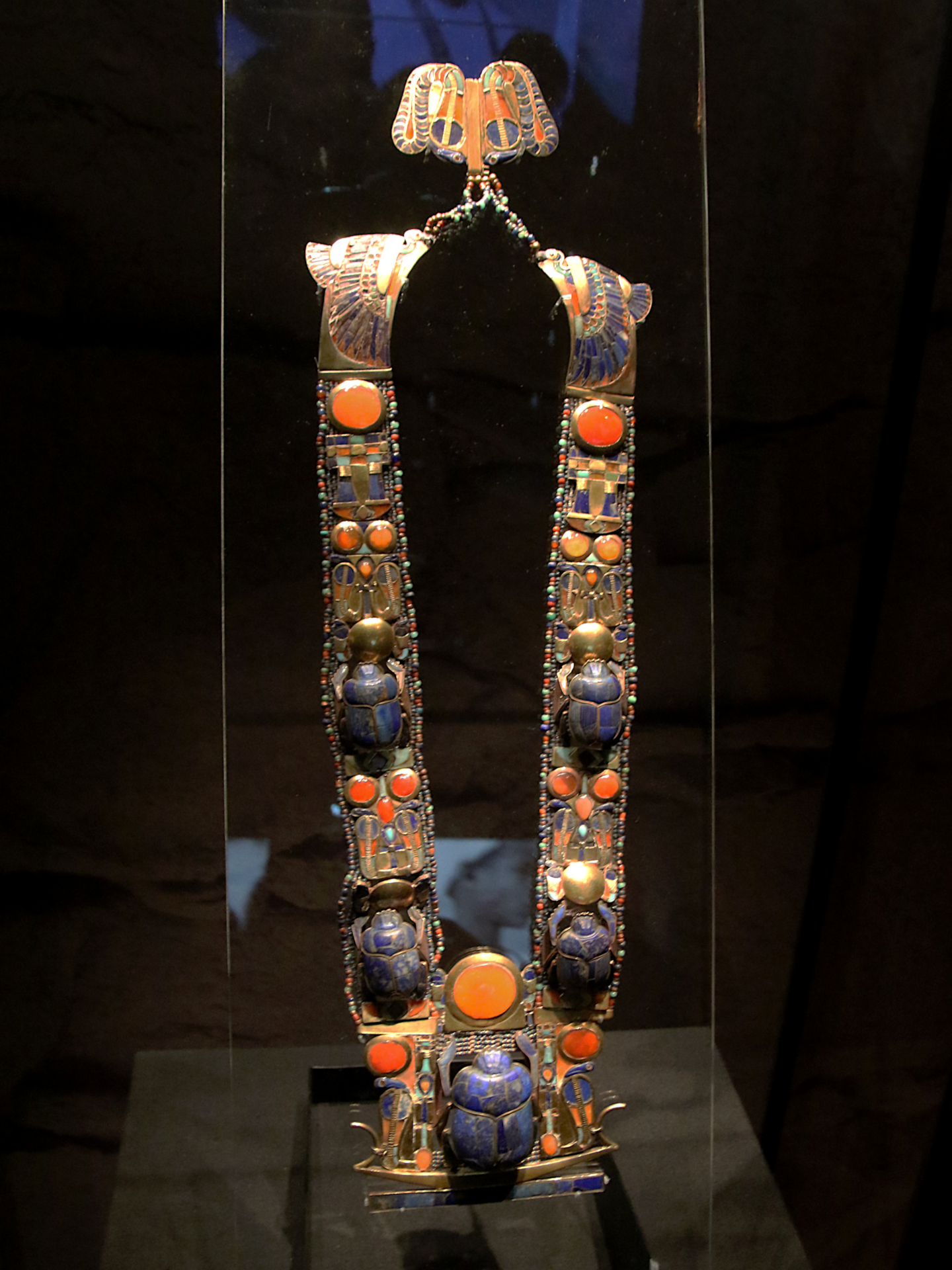
King Tutankhamun Scarab Necklace. Gold, carnelian, lapis lazuli, turquoise, feldspar.

Hussein Abdul Rasoul (Egyptian Arabic: حسين عبد الرسول; was an Egyptian born in Kurna, Luxor. It is not known exactly when he was born, but it can be guessed that he was born in 1910. Known as the "Water Boy", Hussein was part of the team that discovered Tutankhamun's tomb in the Valley of the Kings, led by archaeologist Howard Carter.

Egyptian workers like Hussein have been marginalized in archaeological discoveries for decades. Carter never explicitly mentions Hussein by name in his memoirs, though Lee Keedick, the organizer of Carter's American lecture tour, said Carter attributed the discovery to an unnamed boy carrying water for the workmen. Many recent accounts, such as the 2018 book Tutankhamun: Treasures of the Golden Pharaoh by Egyptologist Zahi Hawass, have identified the water boy as Hussein Abdel Rasoul, a member of a prominent local family. Hawass says he heard the story from Rasoul himself.

== Early life ==
Hussein grew up in a family known for its work in excavating Egyptian antiquities since the 19th century. The discoverer of the Royal Cache was one of Hussein's grandfathers (Ahmed Abdel Rasoul), 10 years before the official announcement of the tomb.

== Discovery of the tomb ==
The official story was told by Egyptologist Zahi Hawass, who worked with Hussein's cousin (Ali Abdel Rasoul), who told him how the events took place. Hussein was 12 years old at the time. His job was to bring water to the workers at the work site to help them endure the harsh heat. People helped him put the water in jars and then put the jars on a donkey to bring to the workers. When he arrived at the site, he and the workers were digging holes to hold the jars. One day while digging one of these jars, they found the tomb.

After opening the tomb, approximately 5,000 artifacts made of pure gold were found inside. Carter was so moved by the discovery and by the role Hussein Abdel Rasoul played in finding the entrance that he dressed him in one of King Tutankhamun's golden necklaces. He also asked his personal photographer Harry Burton to take a picture of Hussein wearing the necklace, (Note: This part of the story is disputed because sources differ on the date the famous photo of Hussein was taken, but it is believed to be between 1922 and 1926.) a picture that the Abdel Rasoul family still keeps to this day, passing it down through the generations as a memory of this historic event.

== Later life ==
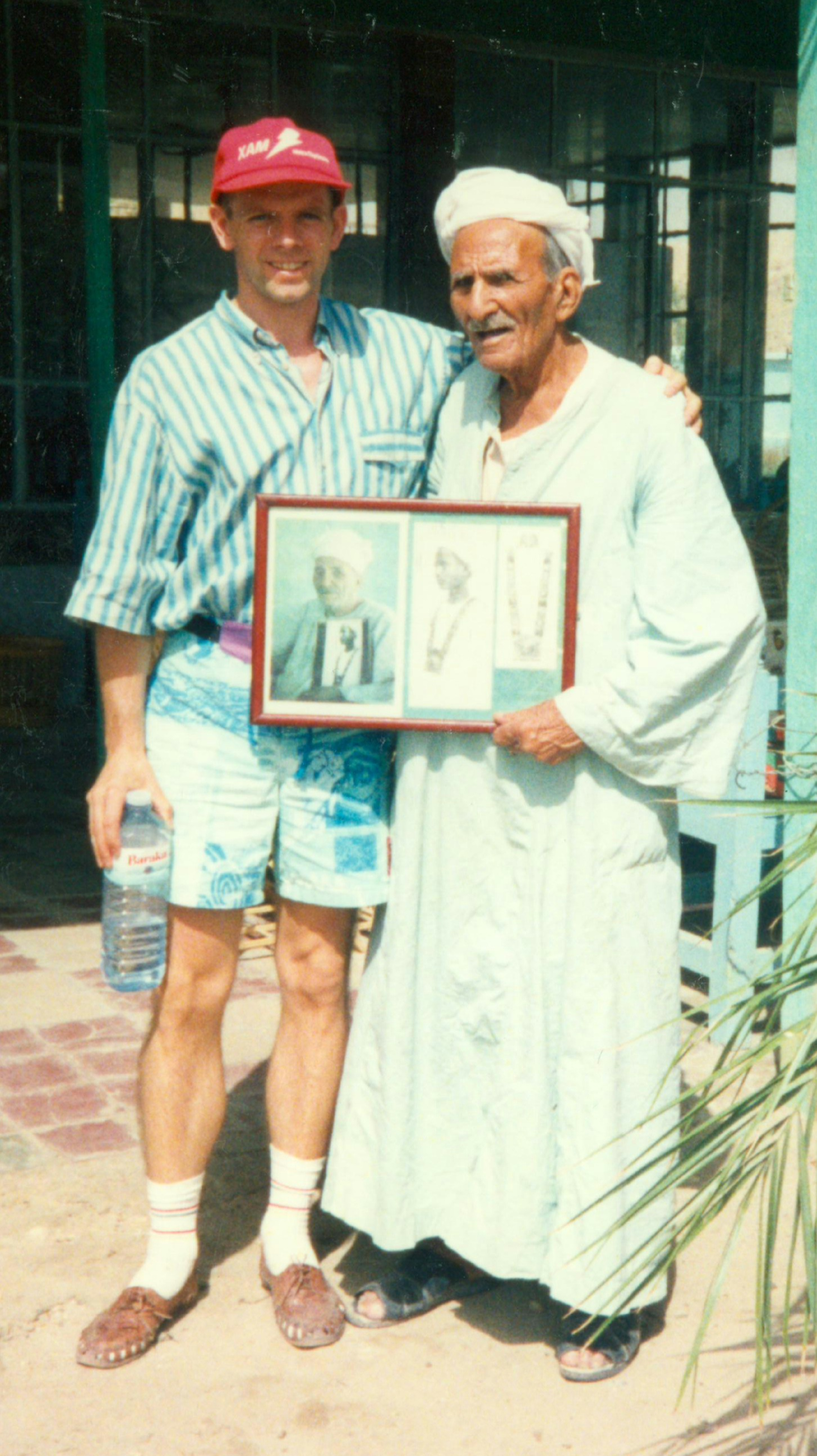
Hussein with a tourist in the early 1990s

He was interviewed by the Tampa Bay Times in 1992, when he was 82. Despite his advanced age, Hussein used to sell tea to tourists at his home next to the Ramesseum, the great funerary temple of Ramses II. He died in 1997.
