= KV7 =

Tomb of Egyptian Pharaoh Ramesses II

- Burial site of Ramesses II
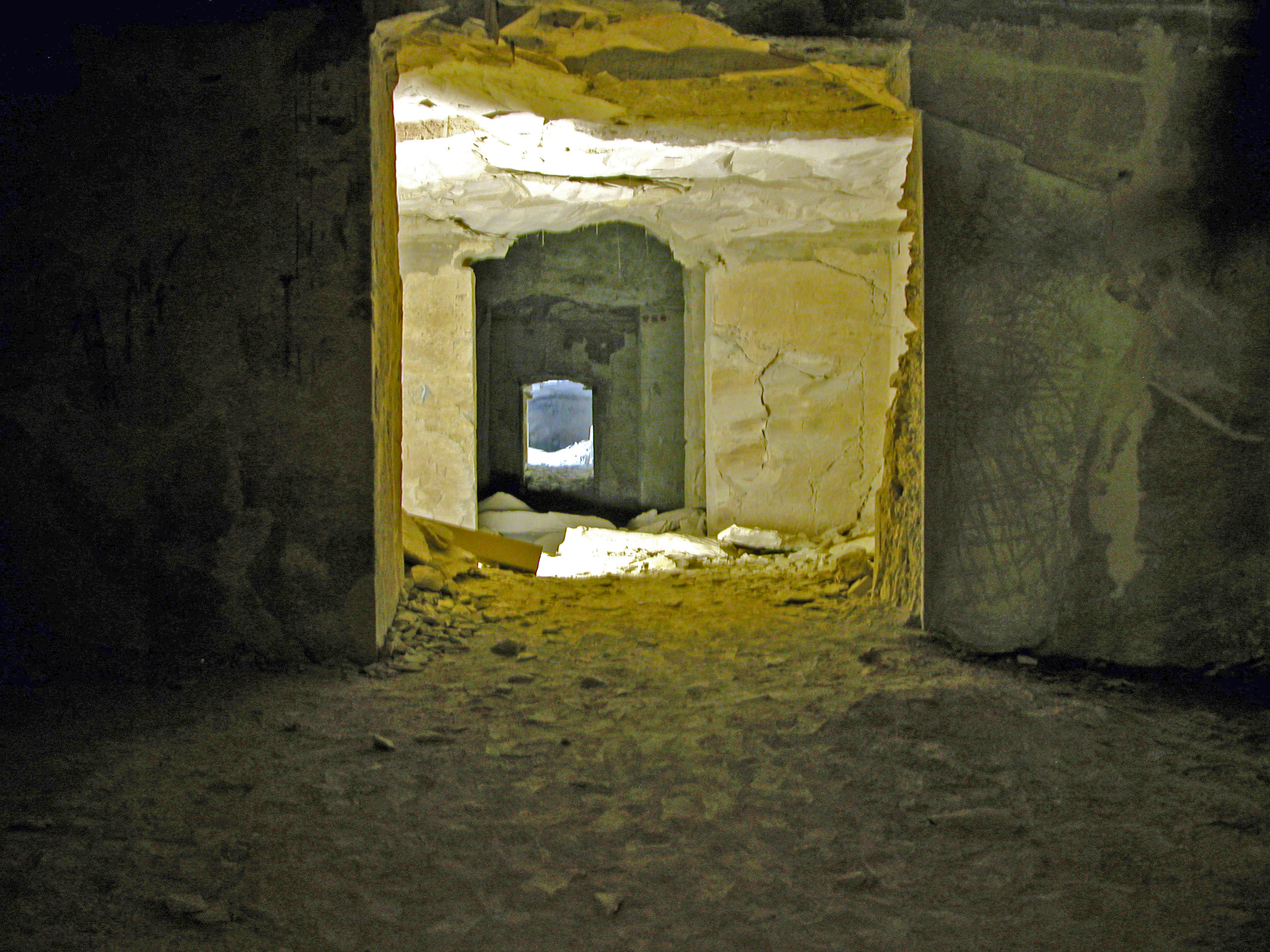
- Entrance to the fourth corridor of KV7

- Location within Egypt
- Coordinates: 25°44′26.3″N 32°36′5.61″E
- Location: East Valley of the Kings
- Discovered: Open in antiquity
- Excavated by: Henry Salt; Jean-François Champollion (1829); Carl Lepsius (1844–45); Theodore Davis and Harry Burton (1913–14); Howard Carter (1917–1921); Christian Leblanc (1991)
- Decoration: Book of Gates; Book of the Heavenly Cow; Amduat; Litany of Ra; Book of the Dead; Opening of the Mouth
- Layout: Bent-axis
- ← Previous; KV6 Next → KV8

Tomb KV7 was the tomb of Ramesses II ("Ramesses the Great"), an ancient Egyptian pharaoh during the Nineteenth Dynasty.

It is located in the main Wadi of the Valley of the Kings opposite the tomb of his sons, KV5, and near to the tomb of his son and successor Merenptah, KV8.

== Decoration and layout ==
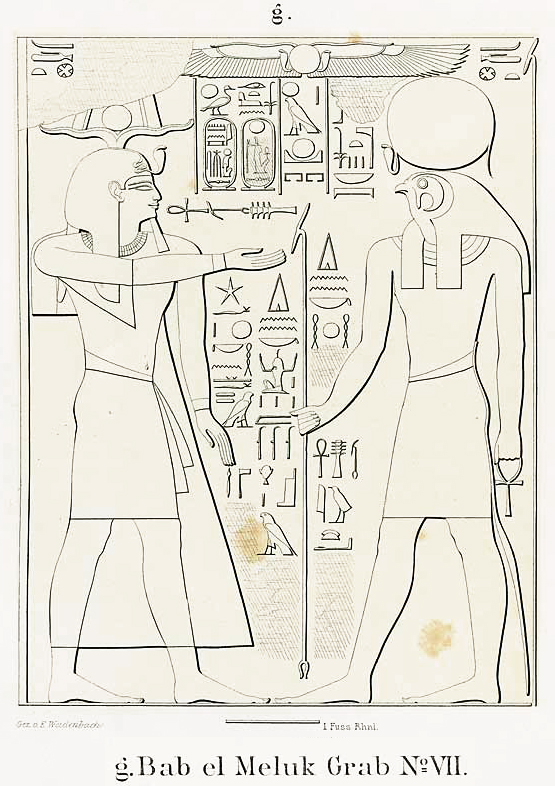
Depiction of Ramesses II and Ra-Horakhty from KV7.

KV7 follows the bent-axis plan of tombs of the earlier Eighteenth Dynasty: the entrance to the tomb is dug into the Theban limestone hillside near the valley floor. The first gate, Gate B, has decorations on the lintel "of the solid disk flanked by Nephthys and Isis, representations of Ma'at kneeling above the heraldic plants of Lower and Upper Egypt, and door jambs contain[ing] the names and epithets of the King."

"The passage descends for about 58 meters (190 feet) into the bedrock at an angle that varies between 12 and 22 degrees." Gates C and D are painted with texts from the Litany of Re and images of the four sons of Horus respectively.

The passage opens into a small well chamber, then into a pillared chamber designated F. F has two directions. Turning right, are two more chambers. Going straight, the passage "continues approximately level for another 12 meters (39 feet), then turns to the right and terminates in the burial chamber J, which is partly carved in a layer of Esna shale." J has four doorways leading to two small (Ja and Jb) and two larger rooms (Jc and Jd), the last of these having two offshoots of its own.

Other decorations in the tomb include images of funerary objects intended to help the pharaoh in the afterlife; and scenes and passages from the Book of Gates, the Book of the Dead, the Book of the Heavenly Cow, the Amduat, the Litany of Re and the Opening of the Mouth. In a recess of the doorway between the 3rd and 4th corridors, the cartouche of his Great Royal Wife, Nefertari, appears. During the entire Ramesside Period (the 19th and 20th Dynasties), she was the only queen who appeared in her husband's tomb.

Unlike other tombs in the area, Tomb KV7 was placed in an unusual location and has been badly damaged by the flash floods that periodically sweep through the valley. Because of this, much of the decoration has been damaged beyond repair. KV7 was the first king's tomb to be placed in the lower part of the central Wadi.

== History ==
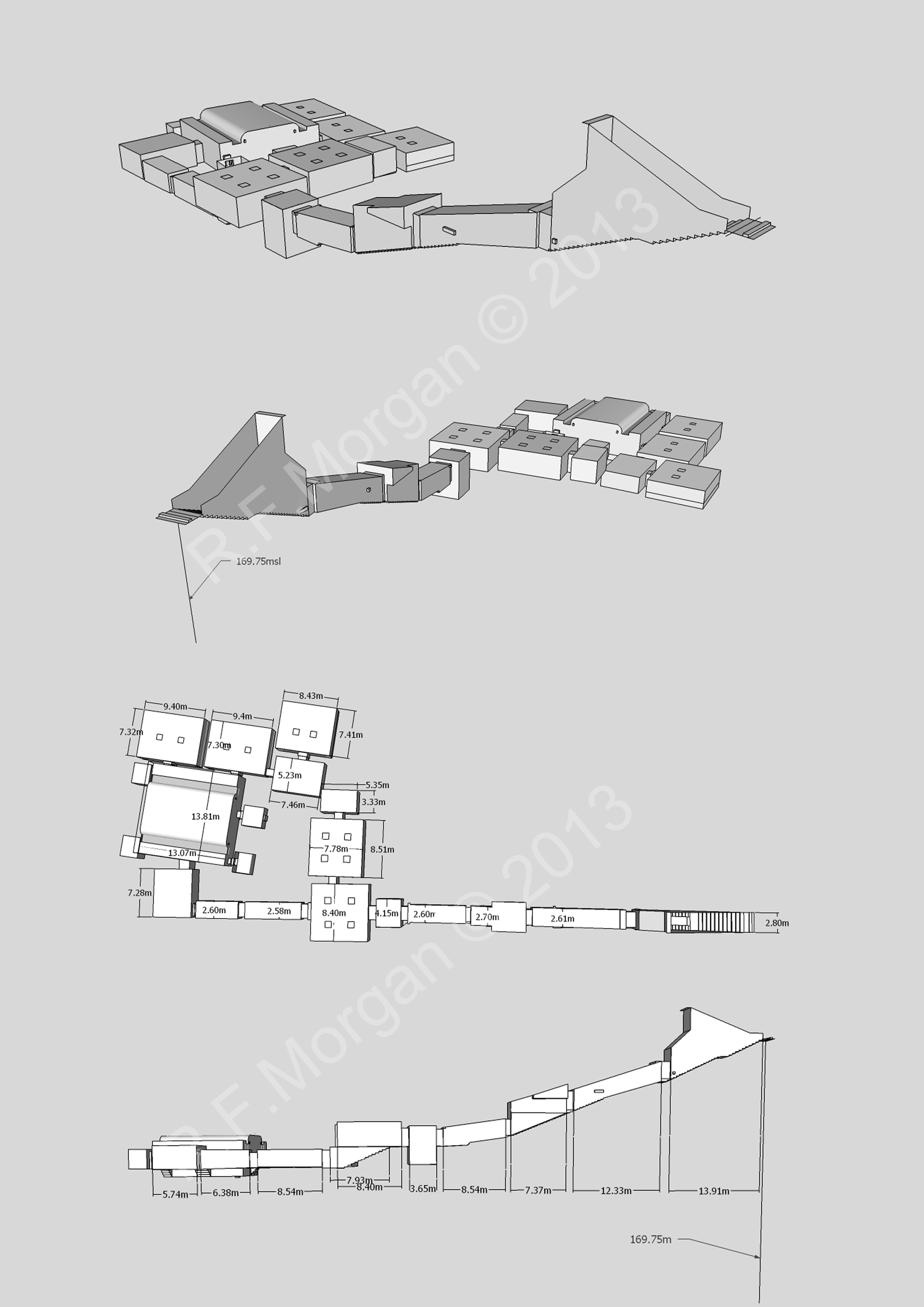
Schematic of KV7

Christian Leblanc, as part of a joint Franco-Egyptian mission in 1991, determined that construction of the tomb was begun before the end of Ramesses II's second year on the throne and took no more than ten or twelve years to complete.

After the tomb was almost broken into during the Deir el-Medina strikes, as depicted in the Strike Papyrus of the 29th year of Ramesses III, Ramesses II's mummy was moved to the tomb of his father Seti I, then to the mummy cache in DB320. The original granite sarcophagus of Ramesses II was later reused by a high priest of the 21st Dynasty named Menkheperre, around 1000 BCE.

Tourists during the Third Intermediate and Roman periods left "abundant quantities" of potsherds in the burial chamber and nearby antechamber. Greek tourists, like "Herakleos, Echeboulos of Rhodes, Deilos and a certain Se(l)aminion of Cyprus", carved their names into the first corridor.

The British consul Henry Salt and, in 1829, Champollion both worked to clear earth that had filled in the tomb.

It was still only by crawling that Richard Lepsius was able to reach the end of the tomb in 1844–1845, exploring the accessible rooms and planning the underground complex, the walls of which, he noted, had been badly damaged by silt and gravel. Lepsius not only provided the first precise plan of the tomb but also guessed the existence, to the east of the pillared chamber (F), of two rooms which are still inaccessible. Only much later was Lepsius' plan revised by the team of the Theban Mapping Project of the University of California, Berkeley.

When Theodore Davis obtained the concession for the Valley of the Kings, he and Harry Burton undertook excavations of the tomb (1913–1914), the work renewed by Howard Carter (1917–1921), not only inside but also outside the tomb. It was during these undertakings that the first remains of the royal funerary furniture were revealed, notably those pieces now in the collections of the Metropolitan Museum of Art in New York and the British Museum."

== Site Preservation and Conservation ==
Due to the placement of KV7 in the Valley of the Kings, the site itself is able to provide an insight into the damage that tombs can endure when they are placed in areas that have flashfloods. Captured from debris layers within the tomb, it is determined that KV7 had sustained damage from at least 10 major floods throughout the duration of its existence. Now, cracks in the ceilings and walls of the chambers are being reinforced with studier architecture. Steel rods are being inserted into these cracks in order to help better preserve the tomb and slow down the duration of the damage that it has endured over the years so that further visitations and studying can be conducted at this site. The conservation project itself as well as further excavations is currently being conducted and led by C. Leblanc.
