= KV8 =

Ancient Egyptian tomb of Pharaoh Merenptah

- Burial site of Merenptah
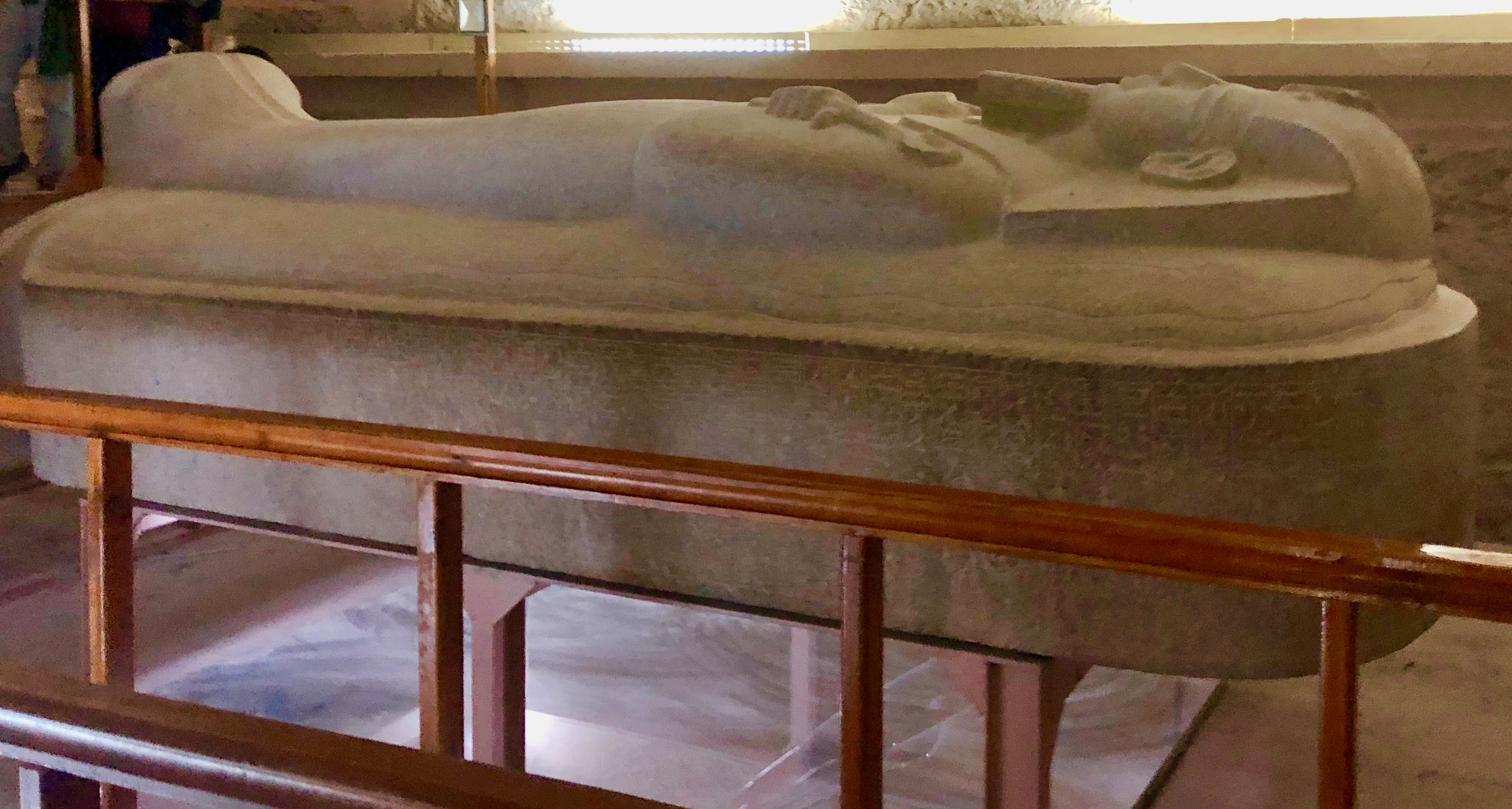
- Lid of Merenptah's stone sarcophagus in KV8

- Location within Egypt
- Coordinates: 25°44′26″N 32°36′3″E
- Location: East Valley of the Kings
- Discovered: Open in antiquity
- Excavated by: Howard Carter
- Layout: Straight axis
- ← Previous; KV7 Next → KV9

Tomb KV8, located in the Valley of the Kings, was used for the burial of Pharaoh Merenptah of Ancient Egypt's Nineteenth Dynasty.

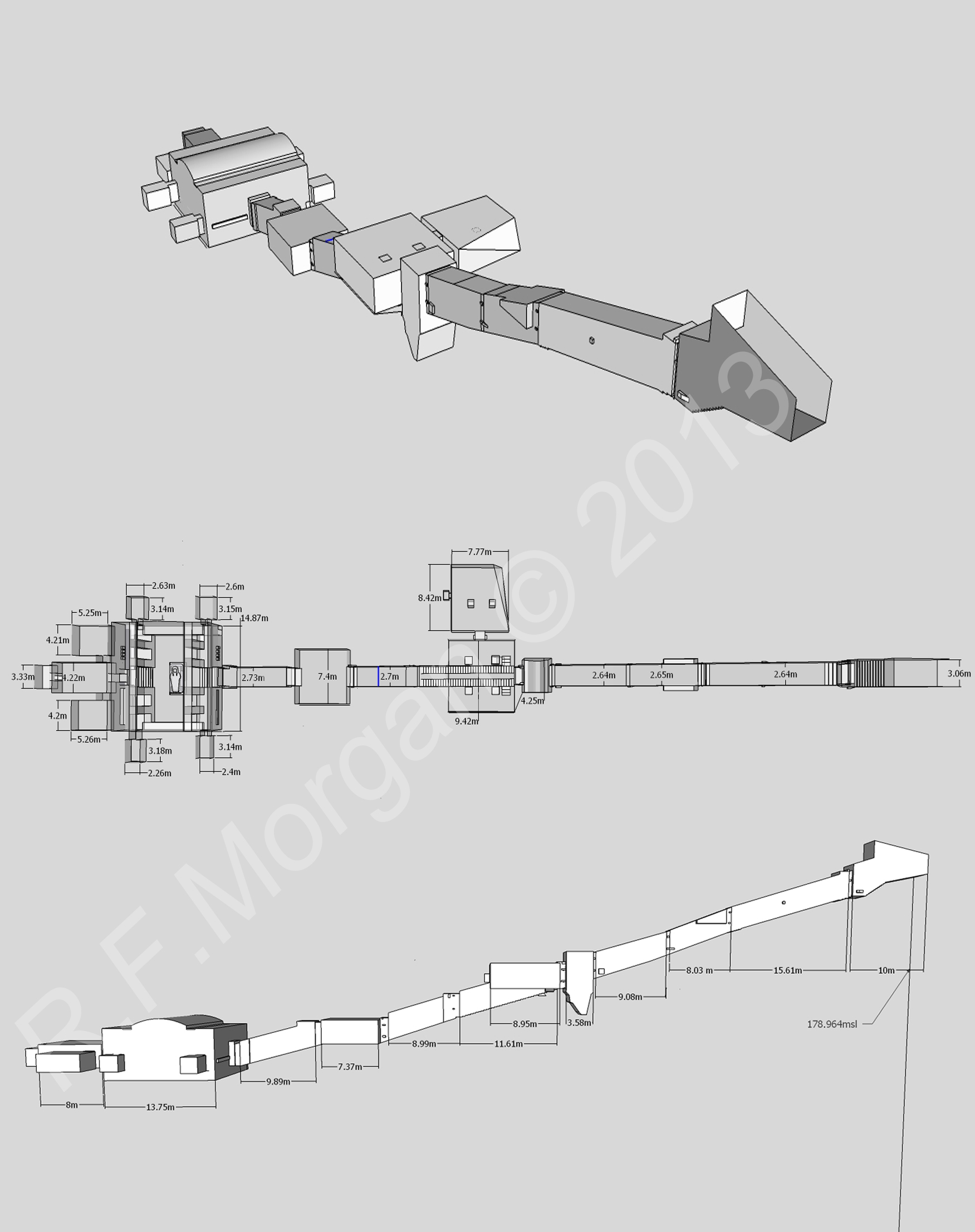
KV8 schematic

The burial chamber, located at the end of 160 metres of corridor, originally held a set of four nested sarcophagi. The outer one of these was so voluminous that parts of the corridor had to have their doorjambs demolished and rebuilt to allow it to be brought in. These jambs were then rebuilt with the help of inscribed sandstone blocks which were then fixed into place with dovetail cramps.

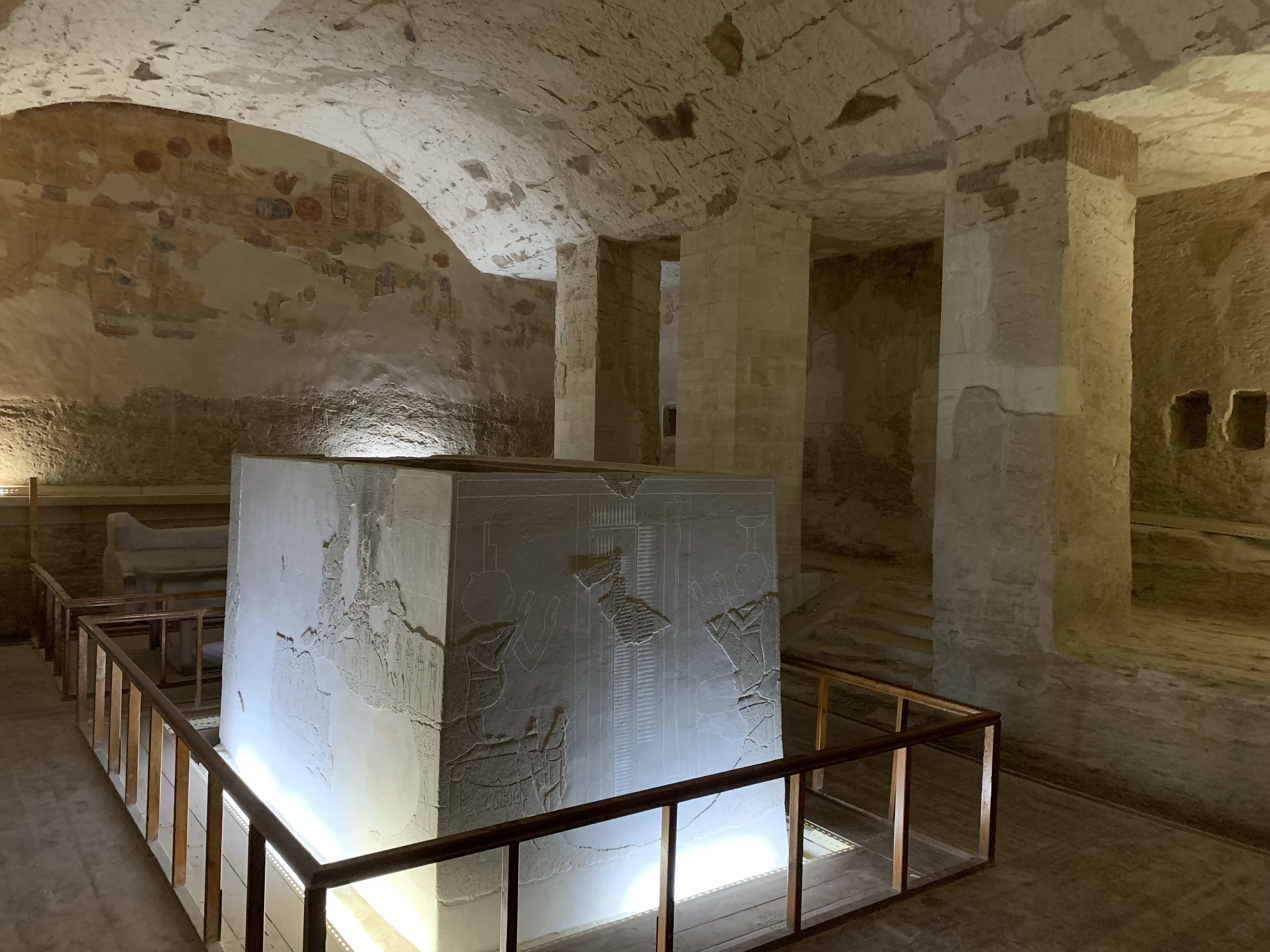
Merenptah's reconstructed stone sarcophagus in 2023

The pillars in Chamber F were removed to allow passage of the sarcophagus, only two were replaced. The other two pillars may have been stolen by Paneb, a worker in the craftsman's village (Deir el-Medina), for use in his own tomb.

During the Third Intermediate Period, Merenptah's mummy was relocated to the mummy cache in DB320. His outer sarcophagus was smashed to retrieve the middle sarcophagus for reuse by Psusennes I in his own tomb in Tanis. The inner sarcophagus was left intact.

== Gallery ==
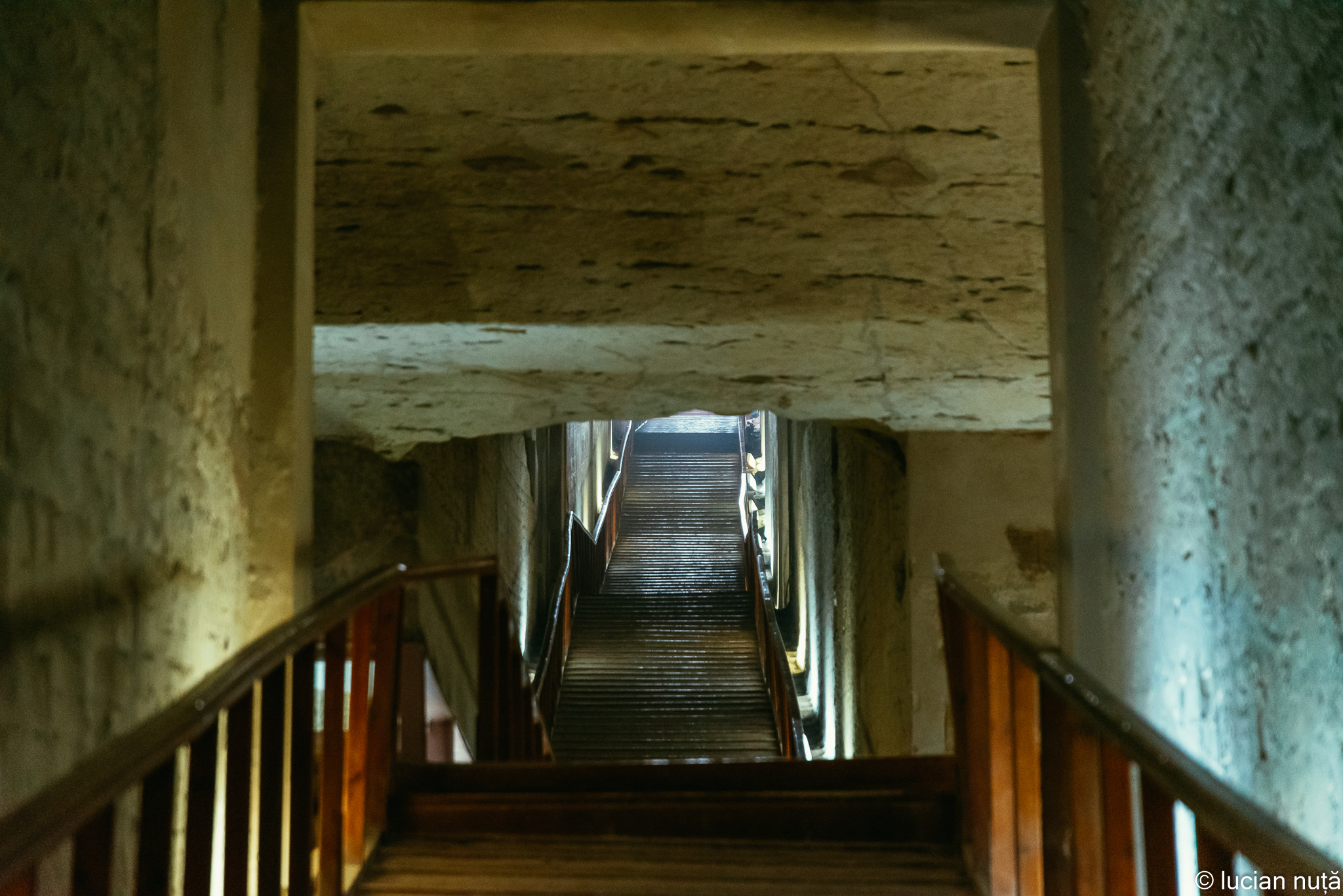
KV8 Tomb corridor

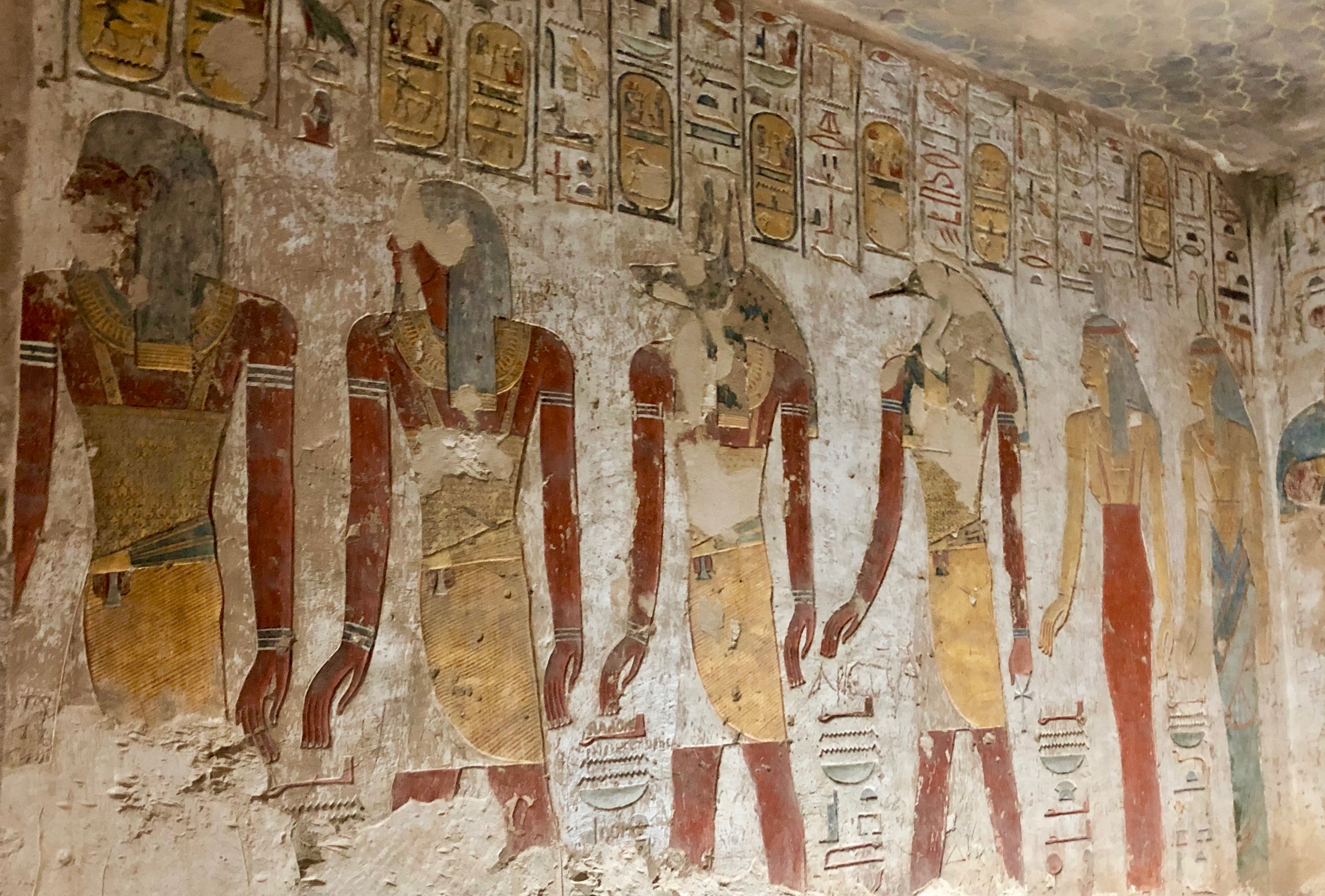
Egyptian Divinities in tomb KV8

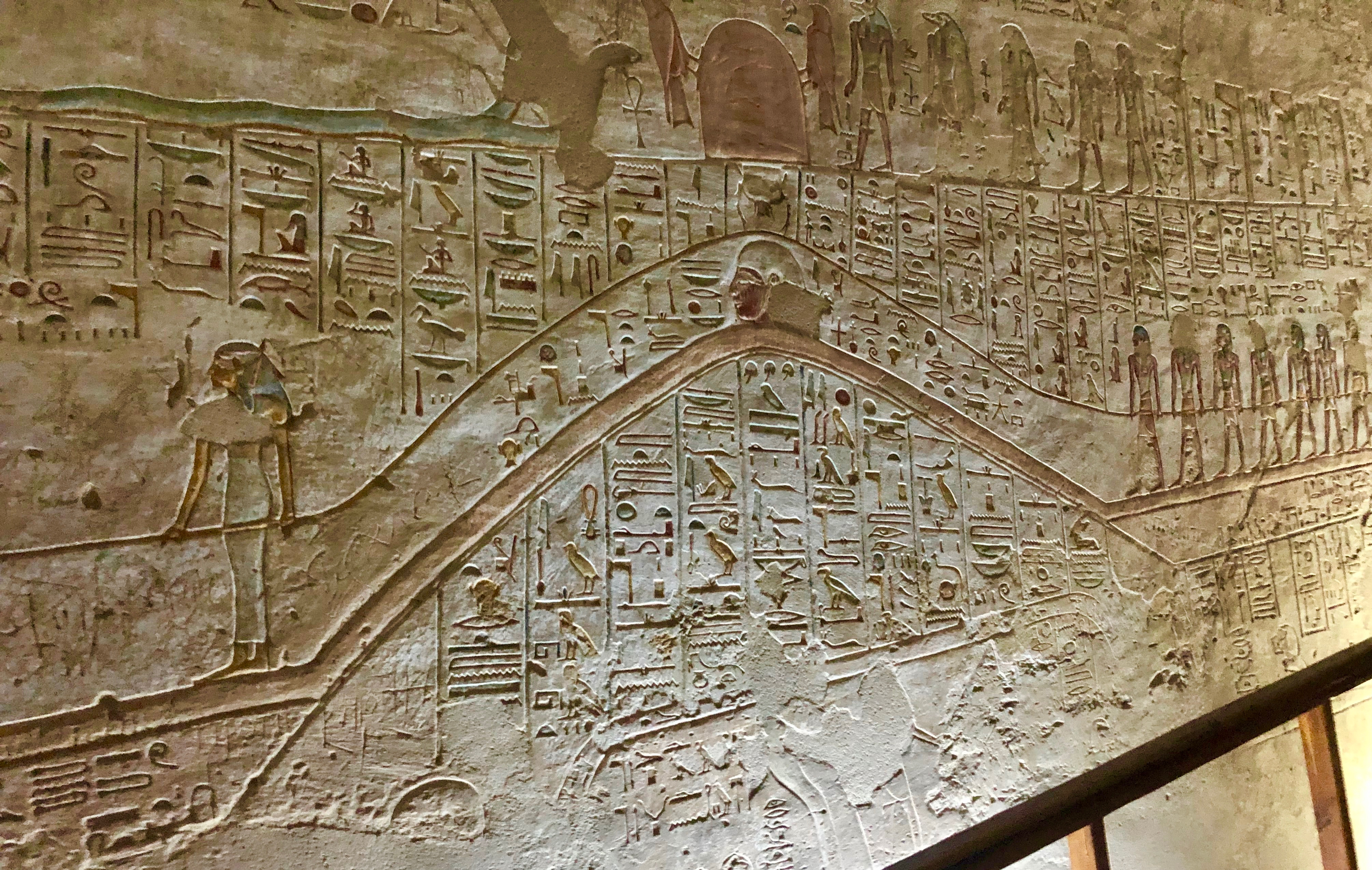
Delicate Bas-hieroglyph reliefs in a long tomb corridor of KV8

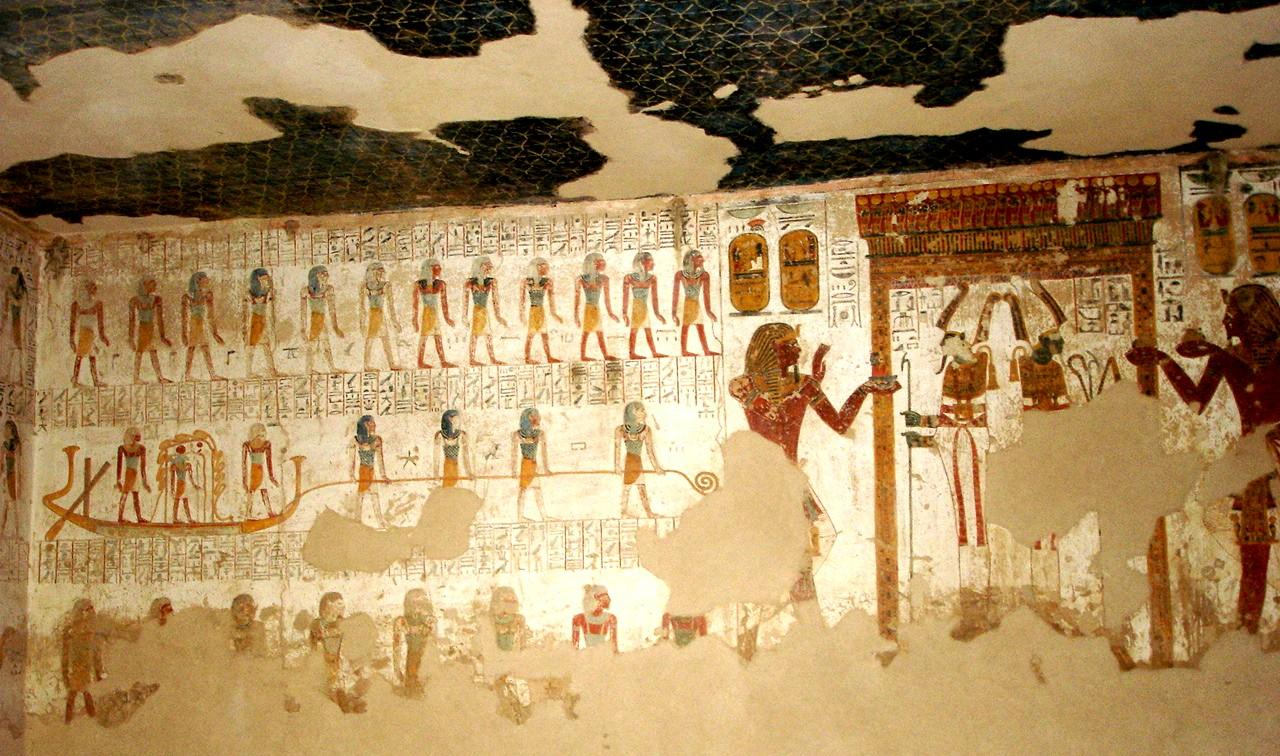
Copy of the Amduat on the walls of tomb KV8

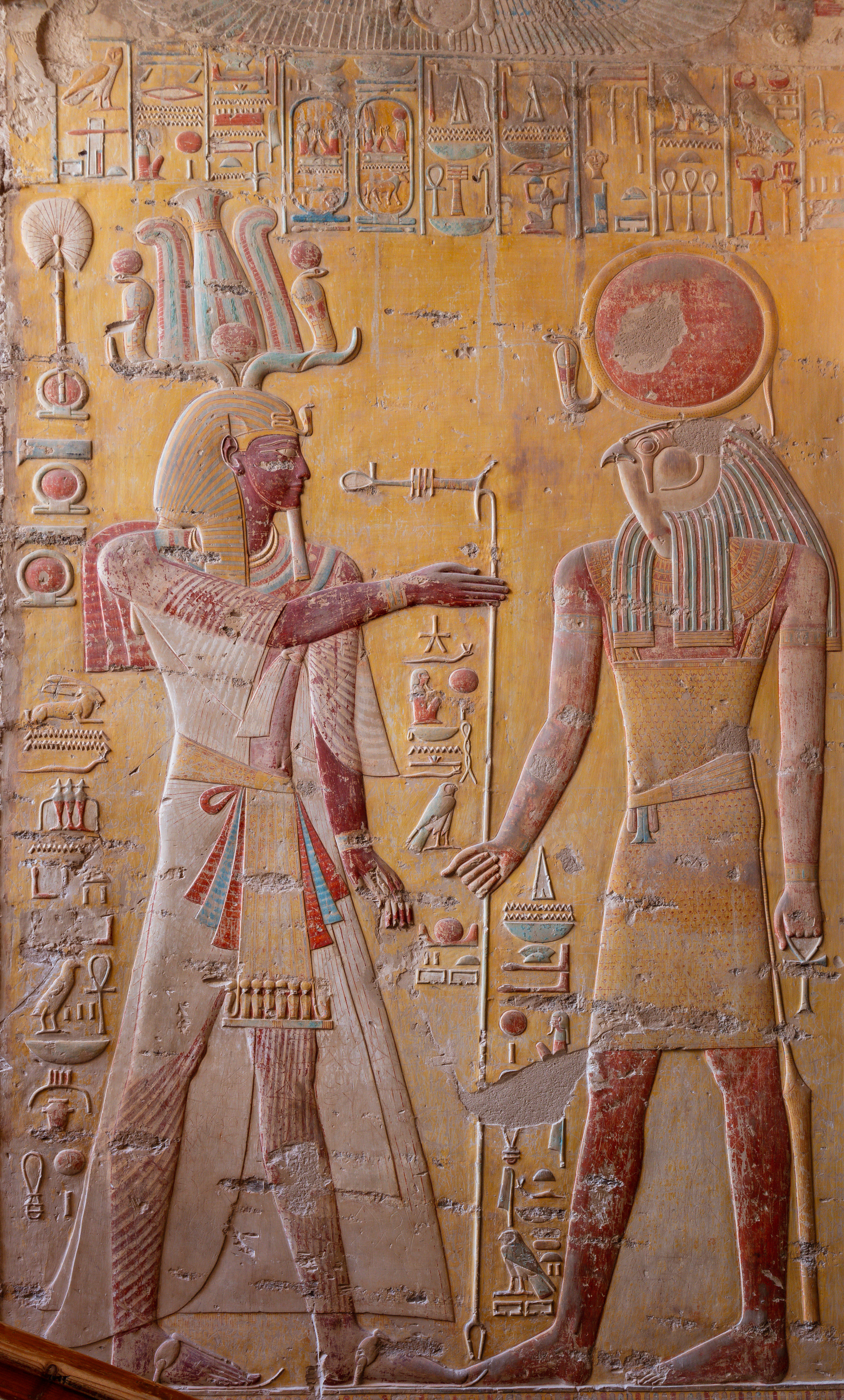
Merneptah greets the god Ra in tomb KV8

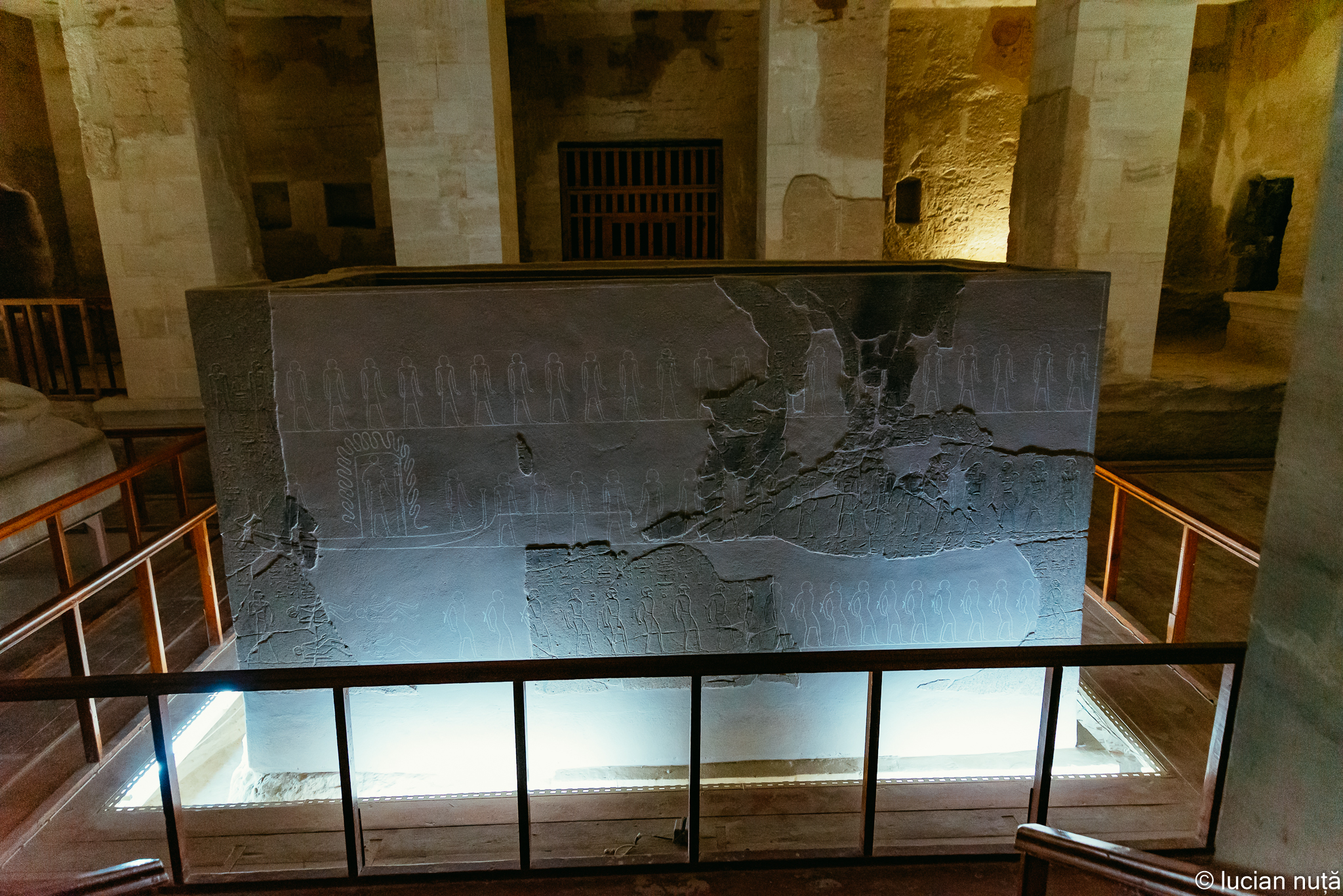
Another view of the reconstructed sarcophagus

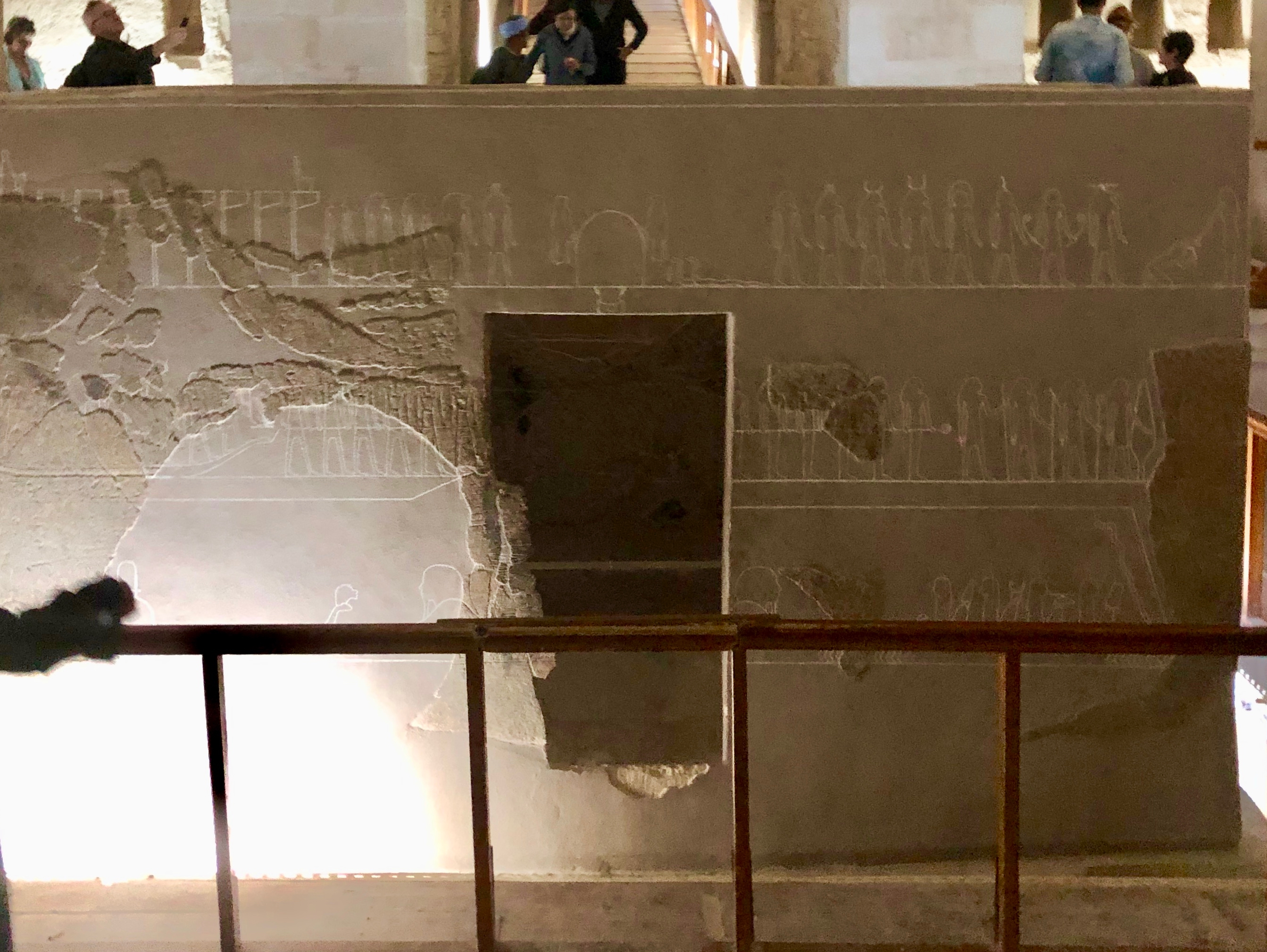
Another view of the reconstructed sarcophagus, showing a hole left by Egyptologists to allow the reconstruction of the interior of the sarcophagus
