= KV6 =

Tomb of Ramesses IX

- Burial site of Ramesses IX
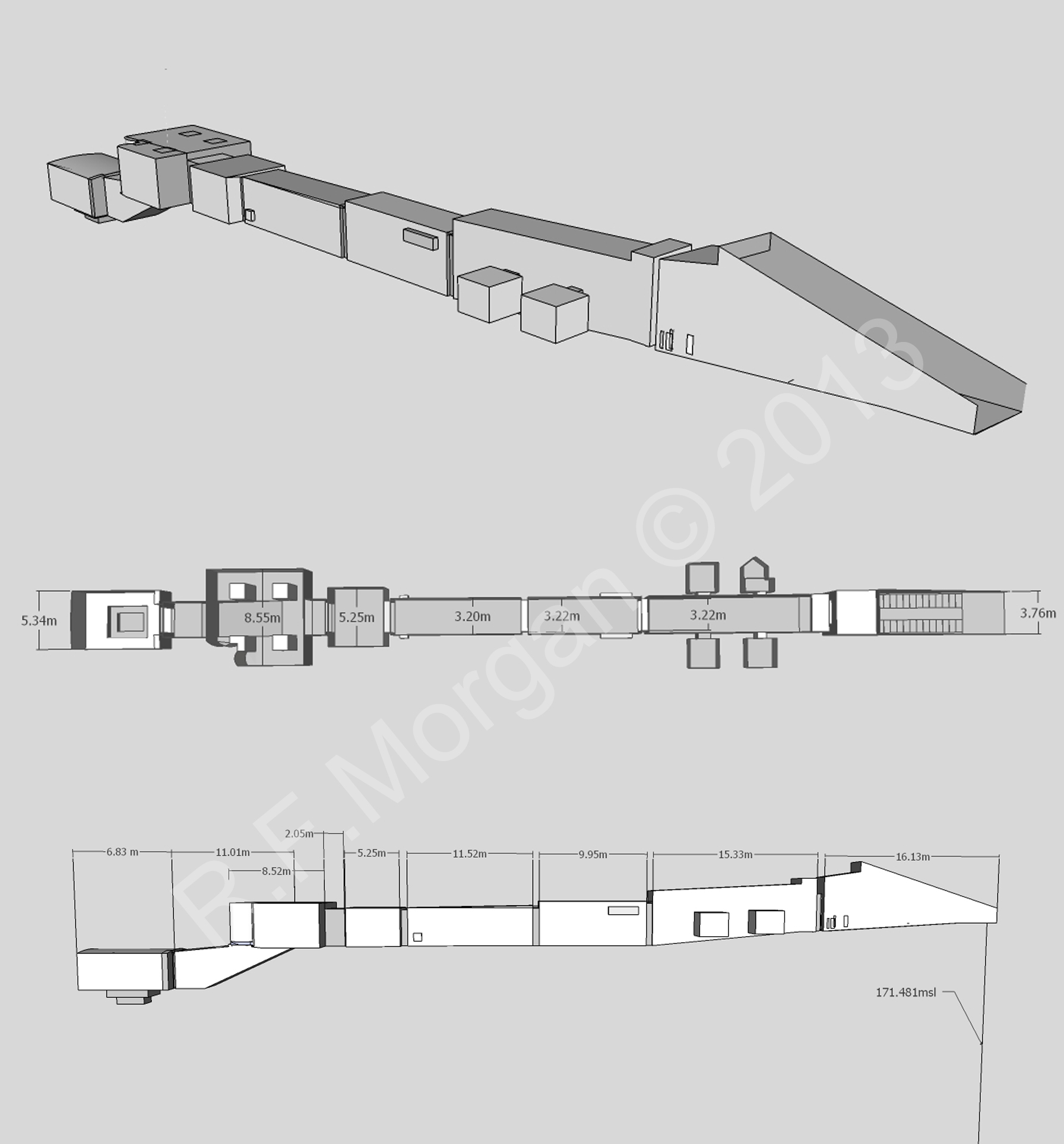
- Schematic of KV6

- Location within Egypt
- Coordinates: 25°44′25.6″N 32°36′06.7″E
- Location: East Valley of the Kings
- Discovered: Open in antiquity
- Excavated by: Henry Salt; Georges Daressy
- Layout: Straight axis
- ← Previous; KV5 Next → KV7

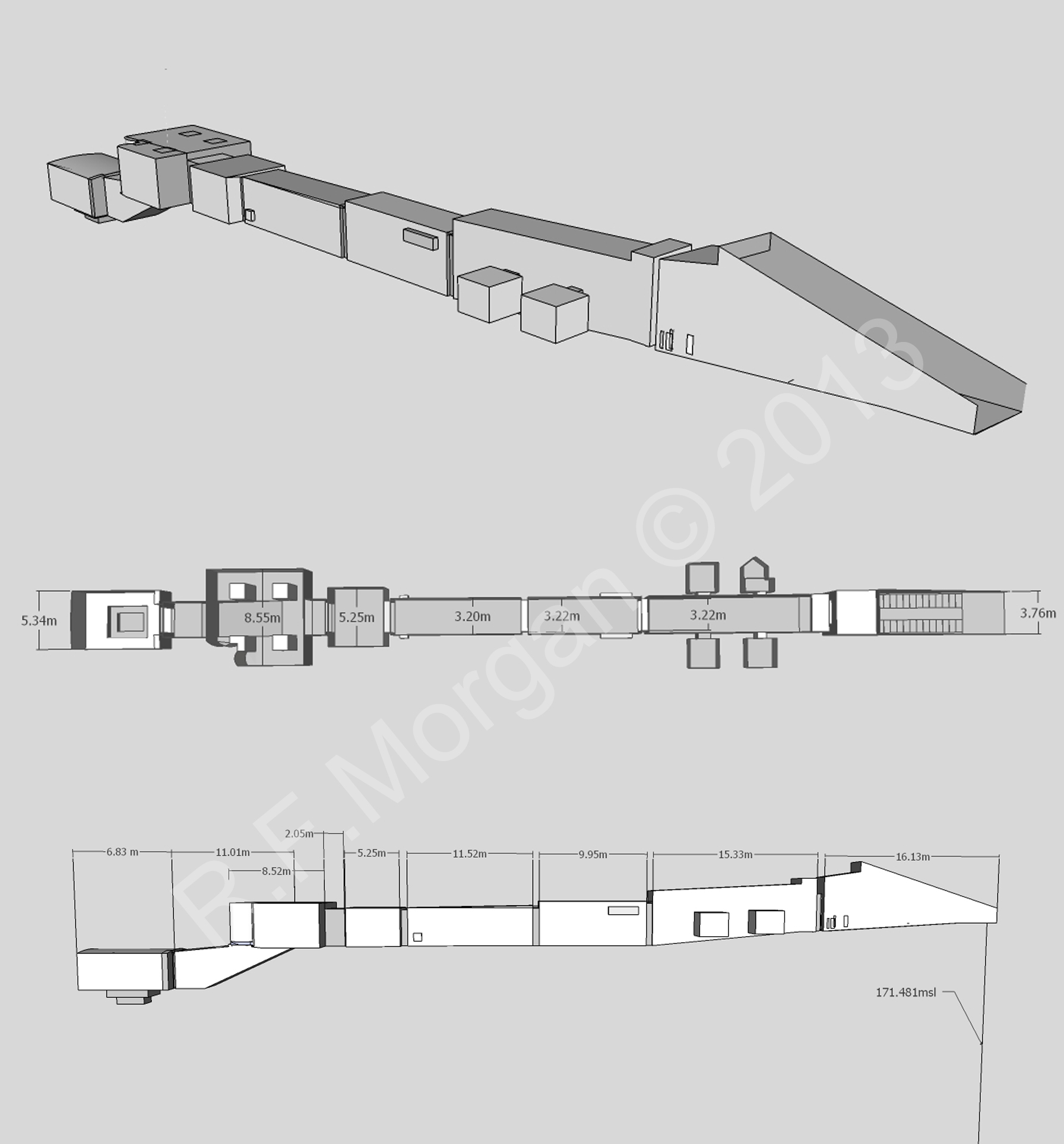
KV6 schematic

Tomb KV6 in Egypt's Valley of the Kings is the final resting place of the 20th-Dynasty Pharaoh Ramesses IX. However, the archaeological evidence and the varying quality of decoration it contains indicates that the tomb was not finished in time for Ramesses's death but was hastily rushed through to completion, with many corners being cut, following his demise. There is evidence that the burial chamber was expanded from its original design as a corridor.

It is located in the central part of the Valley. Its unusually wide entrance stands between, and slightly above, those of two other tombs: KV5 and KV55. Running 105 metres into the hillside, the tomb begins with a gate and a shallow descending ramp followed by three successive stretches of corridor. The first of these has four side chambers – two on each side – but none of these are decorated or finished.

At the end of the corridors come three chambers. The first of these is decorated with the Opening of the mouth ritual, and it is possible that a well shaft would have been dug here had the builders been afforded more time. The second chamber contains four large columns, but neither the cutting nor the decoration work were completed. At the far end of this chamber, a ramp slopes down to the burial chamber, where the pharaoh's sarcophagus was placed (the floor has a rectangular section carved out to accommodate it). The ceiling is vaulted, and is decorated with splendid pictures of the goddess Nut. The side walls show scenes from the Book of Caverns and the Book of the Earth.

The far wall depicts Ramesses on his barque, surrounded by a host of gods. The yellows, dark blues, and blacks used to decorate this chamber are visually striking and unusual among the tomb decorations in the Valley. While the sarcophagus itself has long since vanished, Ramesses IX's mummy was one of those found in the Deir el-Bahri cache (DB320) in 1881.

KV6 has been open since antiquity, as can be seen by the graffiti left on its walls by Roman and Coptic visitors.

== Gallery ==
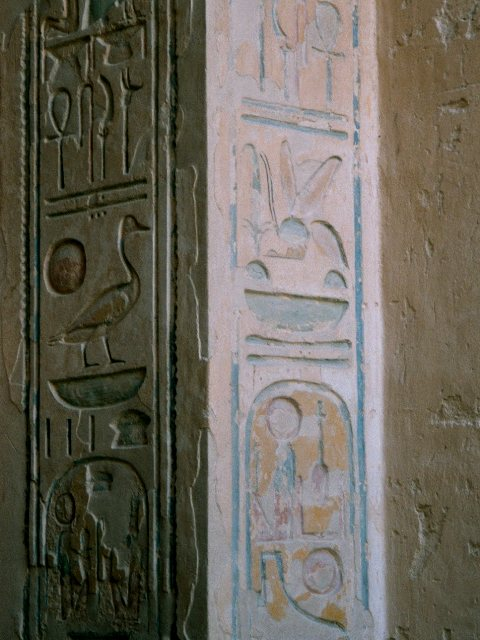
Ramesses IX's names appear on the doorway to the tomb

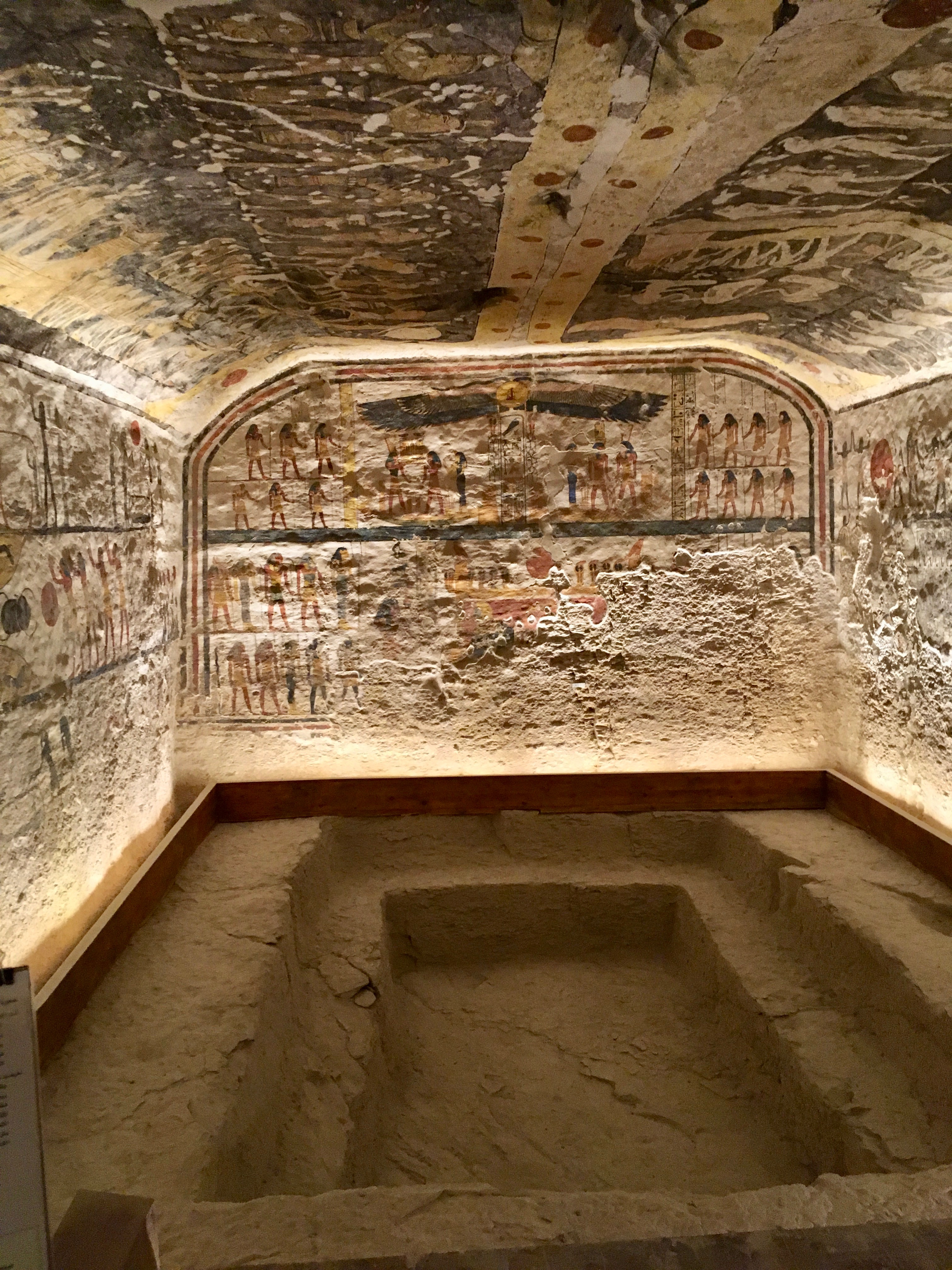
Burial chamber

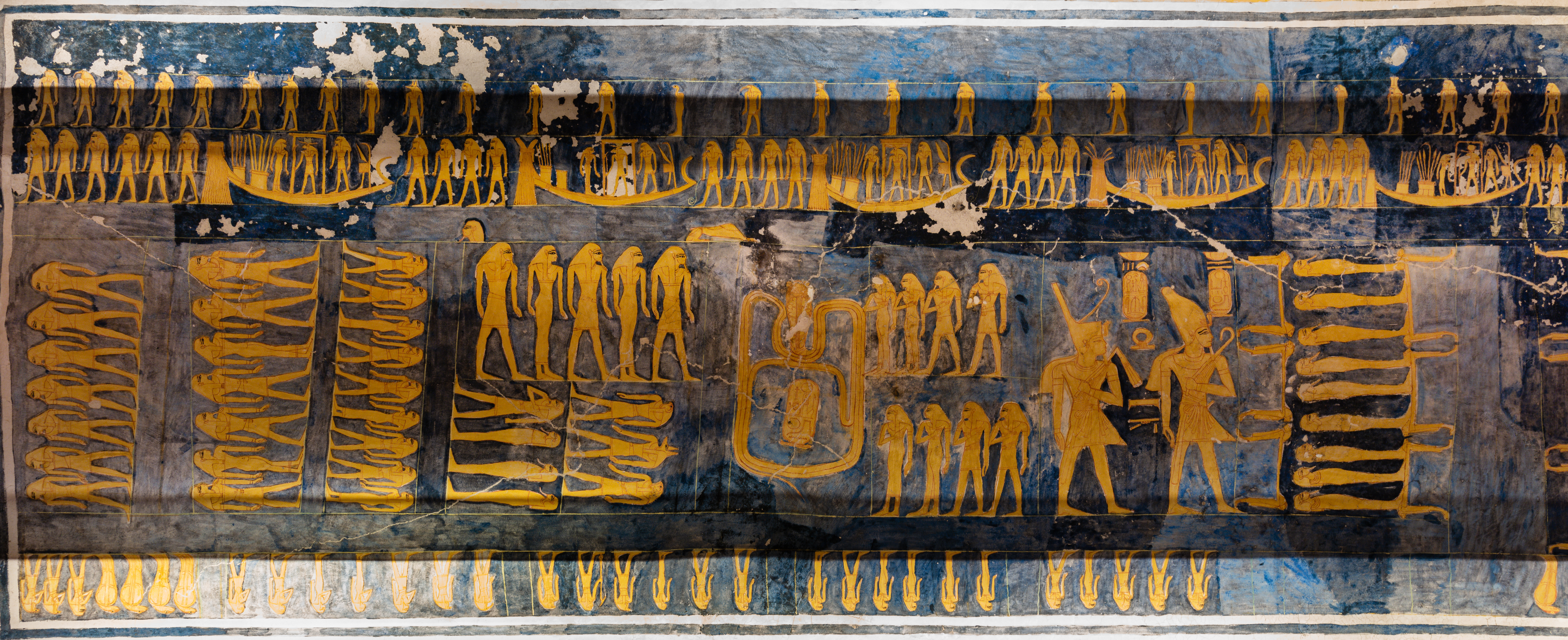
Tomb reliefs of KV6

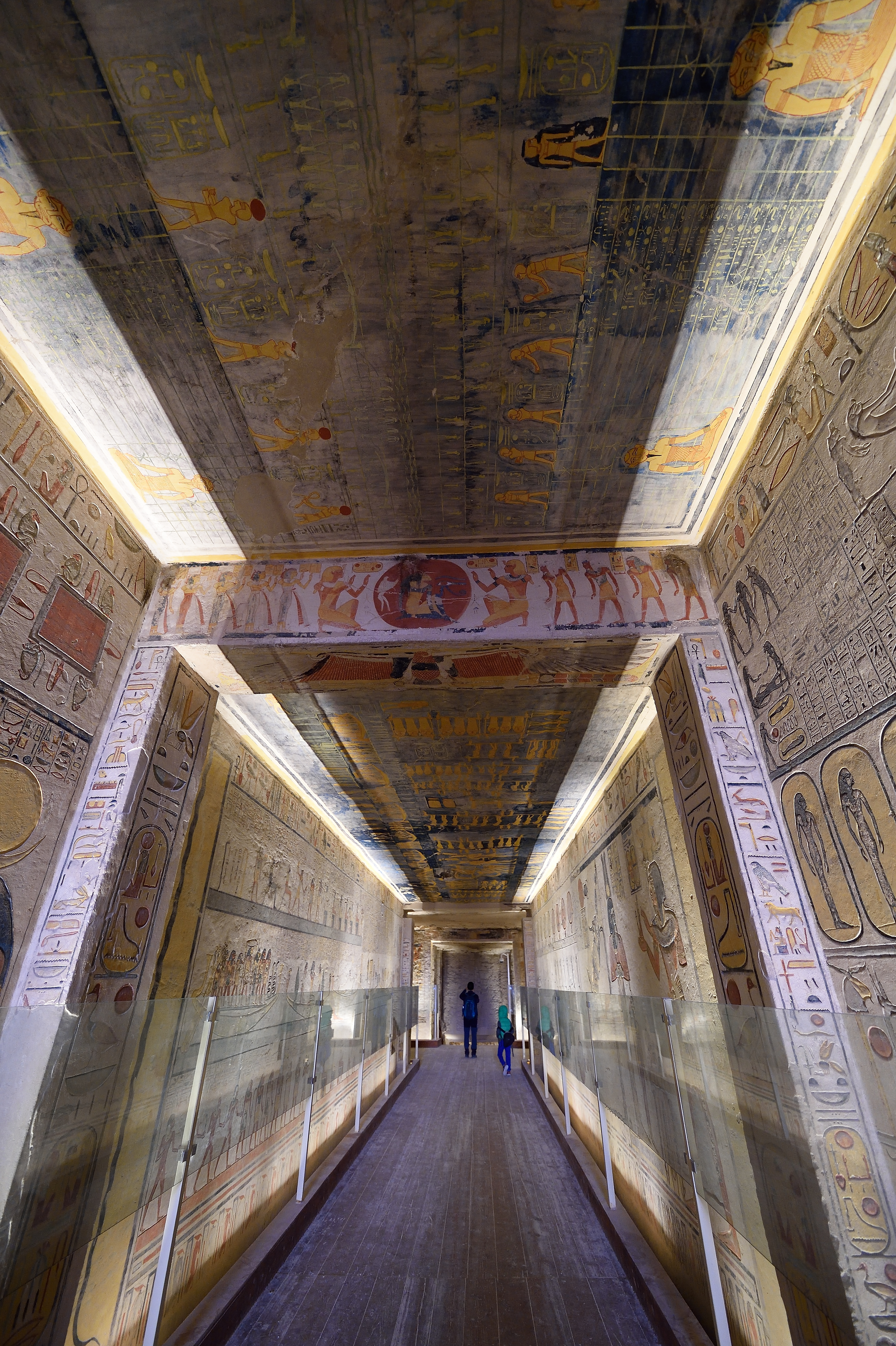
View of the Tomb corridor of KV6

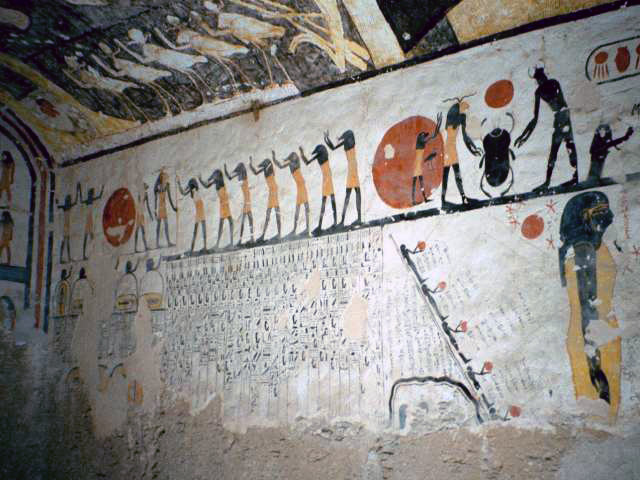
Right wall of the burial chamber

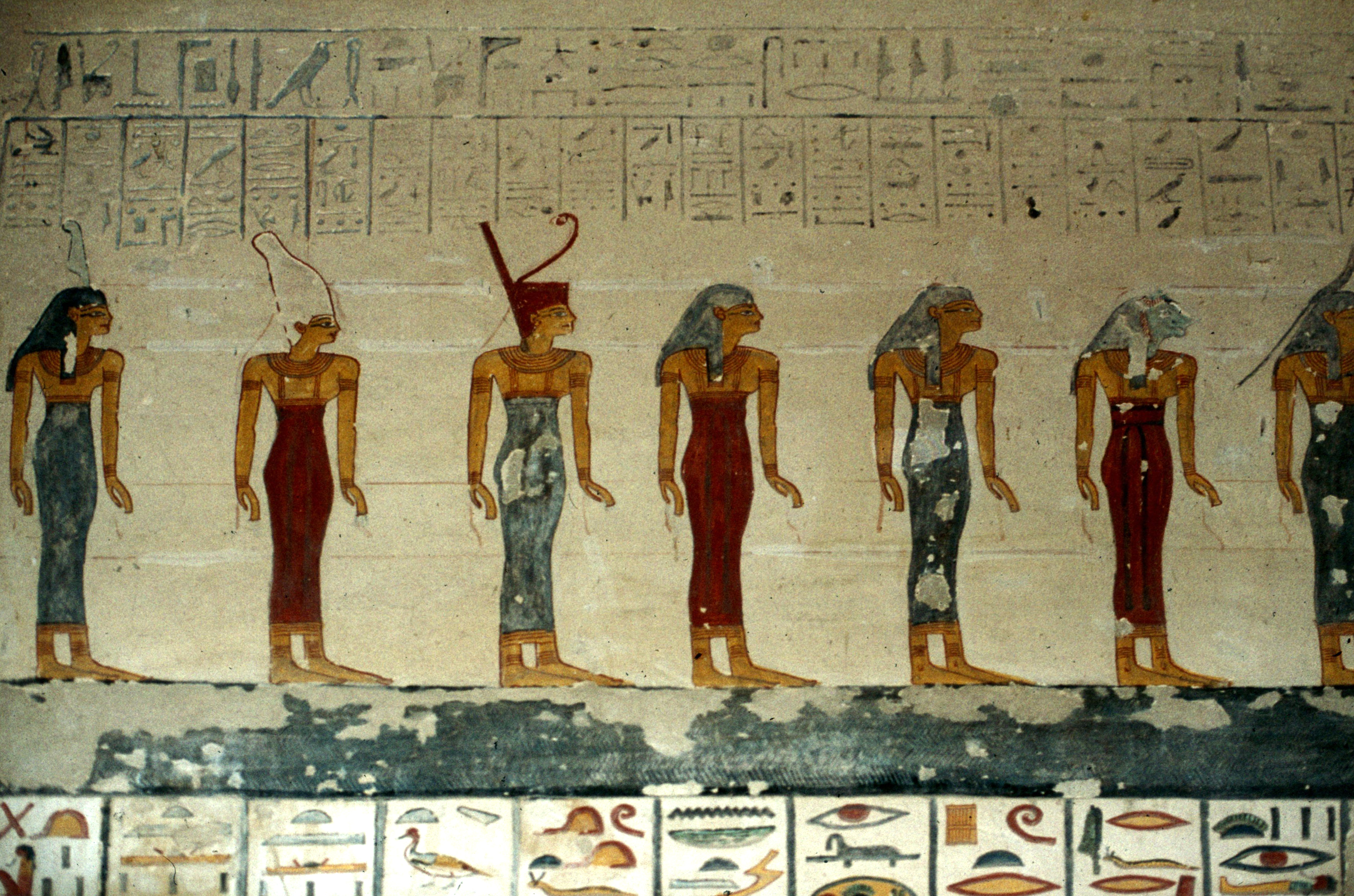
KV6 tomb wall paintings

== See also ==
- Ramesses IX Tomb-plan Ostracon
