= Ramesses IX Tomb-plan Ostracon =

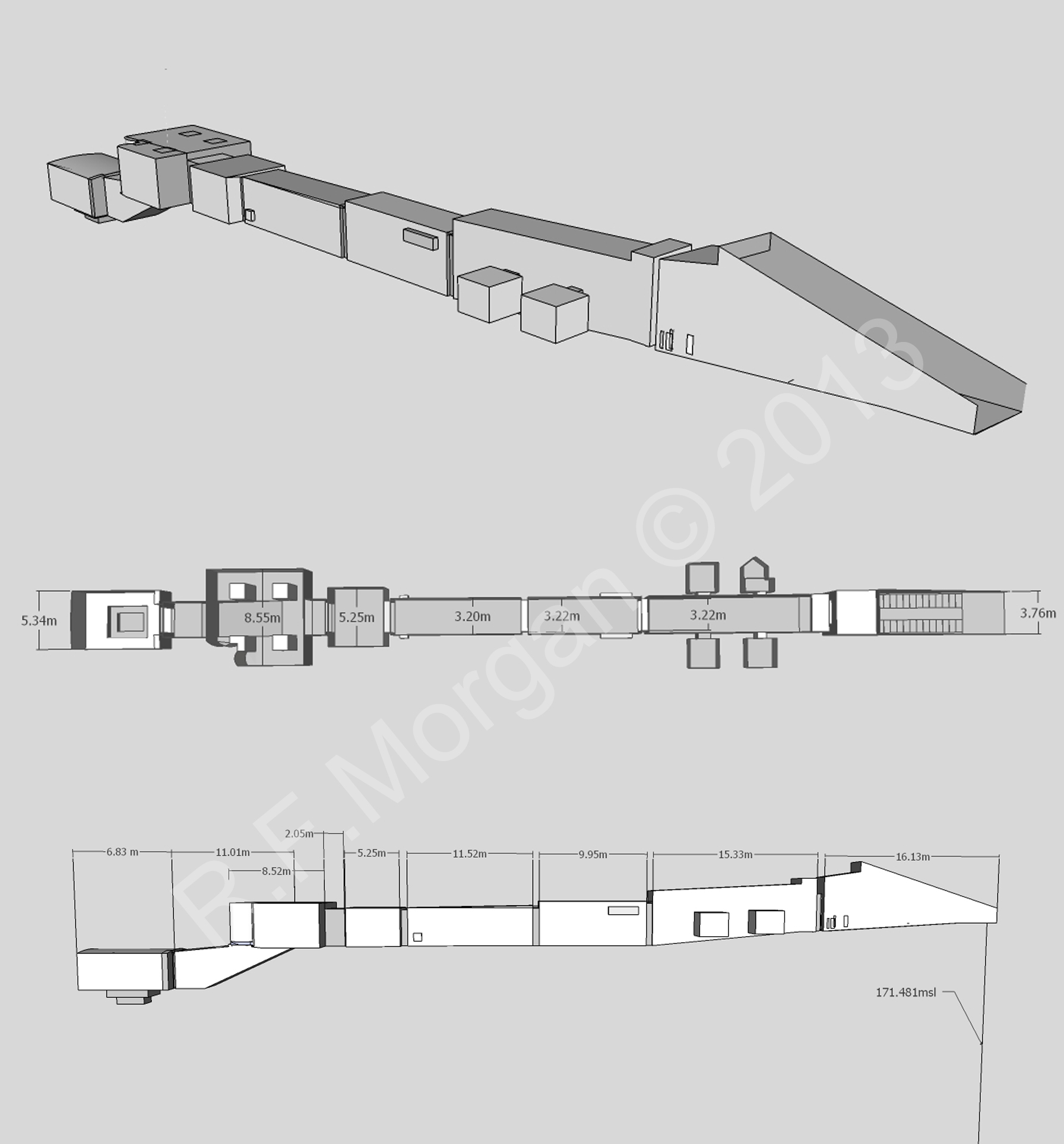
Isometric, plan and elevation images of Rameses IX tumb taken from a 3d model

The Ramesses IX Tomb-plan Ostracon is an Ancient Egyptian ostracon made of pale limestone. It is inscribed with a layout of the tomb of the Pharaoh Ramesses IX in the KV6–Valley of the Kings, and dates from the 20th Dynasty (c. 1100 BC). The ostracon is inscribed on a sherd of approximate dimensions: 0.66m L (2/3 meter) by 0.2m W, and was found within his KV6 tomb.

The 'blueprint-like' "tomb-plan" is not a draft plan of the tomb construction, but is a post-construction record. Notes in Hieratic name rooms, with dimensions. The composition of straight lines, (from a straightedge/device) use mostly 90 degree angles, but the design layout also conforms to the linear shape of the sherd, (thus requiring deviations from the 90 degree right angles).

As a linear sherd, the ostracon is broken into four contiguous pieces. As a dagger-shape, (non-rectangular), this is an atypical usage for ostraca, but the intention was probably durability, its resistance to decay and alteration, (the inks mostly). The sunken-relief (bas-relief) lines, are filled with black ink (some spillovers), and some minor inked regions are marked. The hieratic notes are also in black.

The surviving design layout is about 90 percent complete due to loss of micro-chip edges, especially at the break points, and a few larger flakes.

== Plan layout sequence ==
- Entrance and Stairway
- First Corridor with Annexes (2-right and 2-left)
- Second Corridor
- Third Corridor
- Vestibule
- Pillared Hall
- Burial Chamber
