= KV48 =

Ancient Egyptian tomb of noble Amenemipet called Pairy

- Burial site of Amenemipet called Pairy
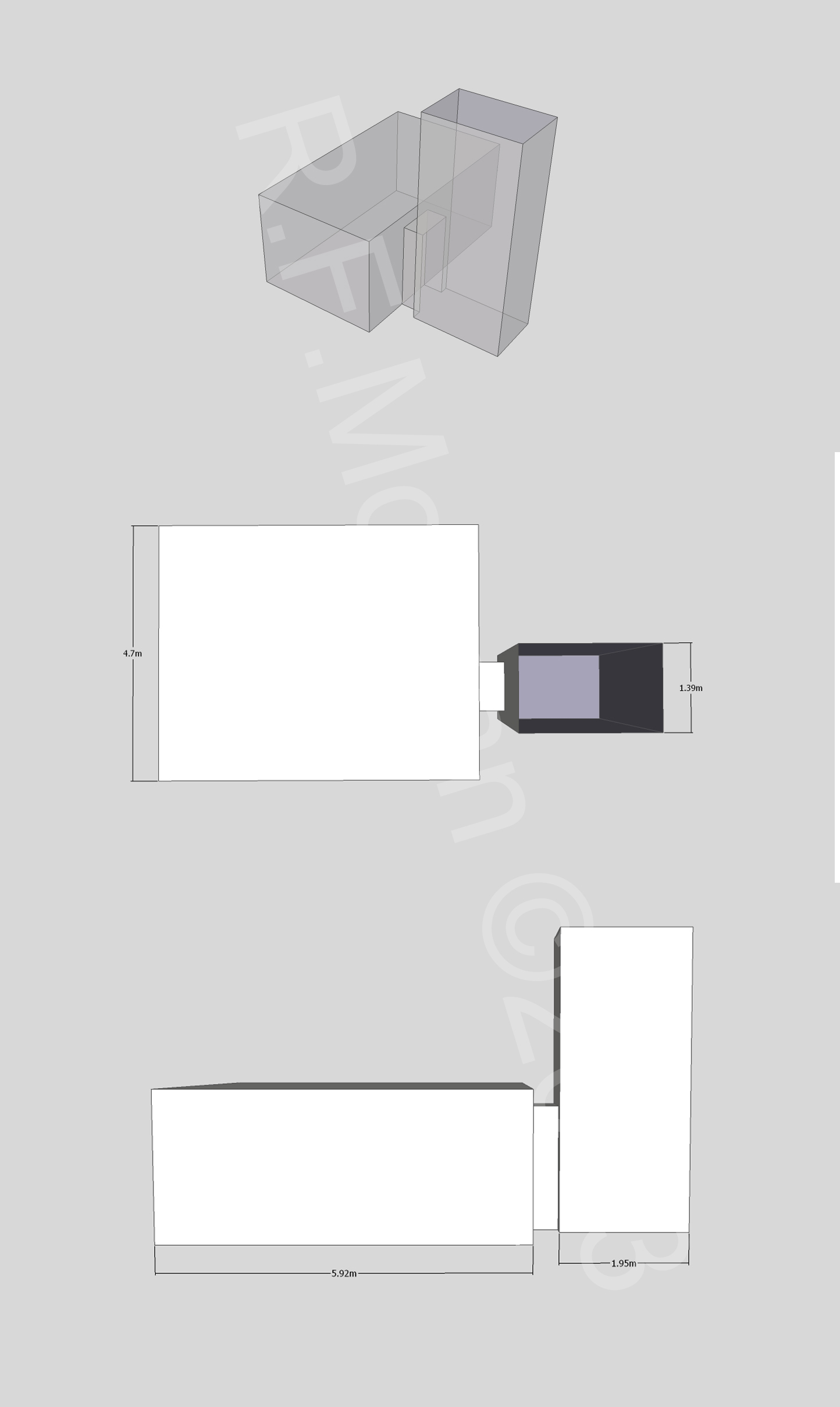
- Schematic of KV48

- Location within Egypt
- Coordinates: 25°44′23.2″N 32°36′1.3″E
- Location: East Valley of the Kings
- Discovered: January 1906
- Excavated by: Edward R. Ayrton (1906); Donald P. Ryan (2009)
- Decoration: Undecorated
- Layout: Shaft and chamber
- ← Previous; KV47 Next → KV49

Tomb KV48 is an ancient Egyptian tomb located in the Valley of the Kings in Egypt. It was discovered in 1906 by Edward R. Ayrton excavating on behalf of Theodore M. Davis, and contained the robbed burial of the Eighteenth Dynasty noble Amenemipet called Pairy. It was re-excavated in 2009 by a team from the Pacific Lutheran University.

== Location, discovery, and contents ==
The tomb is located to the west of the animal tombs KV51 and KV52, on the southern side of the wadi that leads towards KV35, the tomb of Amenhotep II.

The tomb consists of a shaft approximately 20 feet (6.1 m) deep that opens to the southwest to a relatively large chamber measuring 16–17 by 10–11 feet (4.9 m–5.2 m × 3.0 m–3.4 m); the doorway had been roughly blocked with a wall of stacked stones. The walls were not plastered or smoothed. The floor was covered in 6 inches (15 cm) of debris including broken objects, coffin fragments with yellow on black decoration, pieces of a wooden chair, sherds of white-washed pottery, and a mud seal bearing the inscription 'Amun hears good praises.'

The unwrapped and broken mummy of the owner of the tomb was found thrown to one side; Ayrton describes him as "tall and well-built." The presence of three inscribed mud bricks wrapped in resin-coated fabric and fragments of a fourth (so-called magical bricks), along with a number of wooden ushabti allowed him to be identified as the vizier and mayor of Thebes, Amenemipet.

=== Re-investigation ===
The tomb was part of the Pacific Lutheran University Valley of the Kings expedition’s work in 2009. The expedition was led by Donald P. Ryan. The tomb was recorded and excavated and is awaiting publication.
