= KV53 =

Ancient Egyptian tomb in the Valley of the Kings

- Burial site of unknown
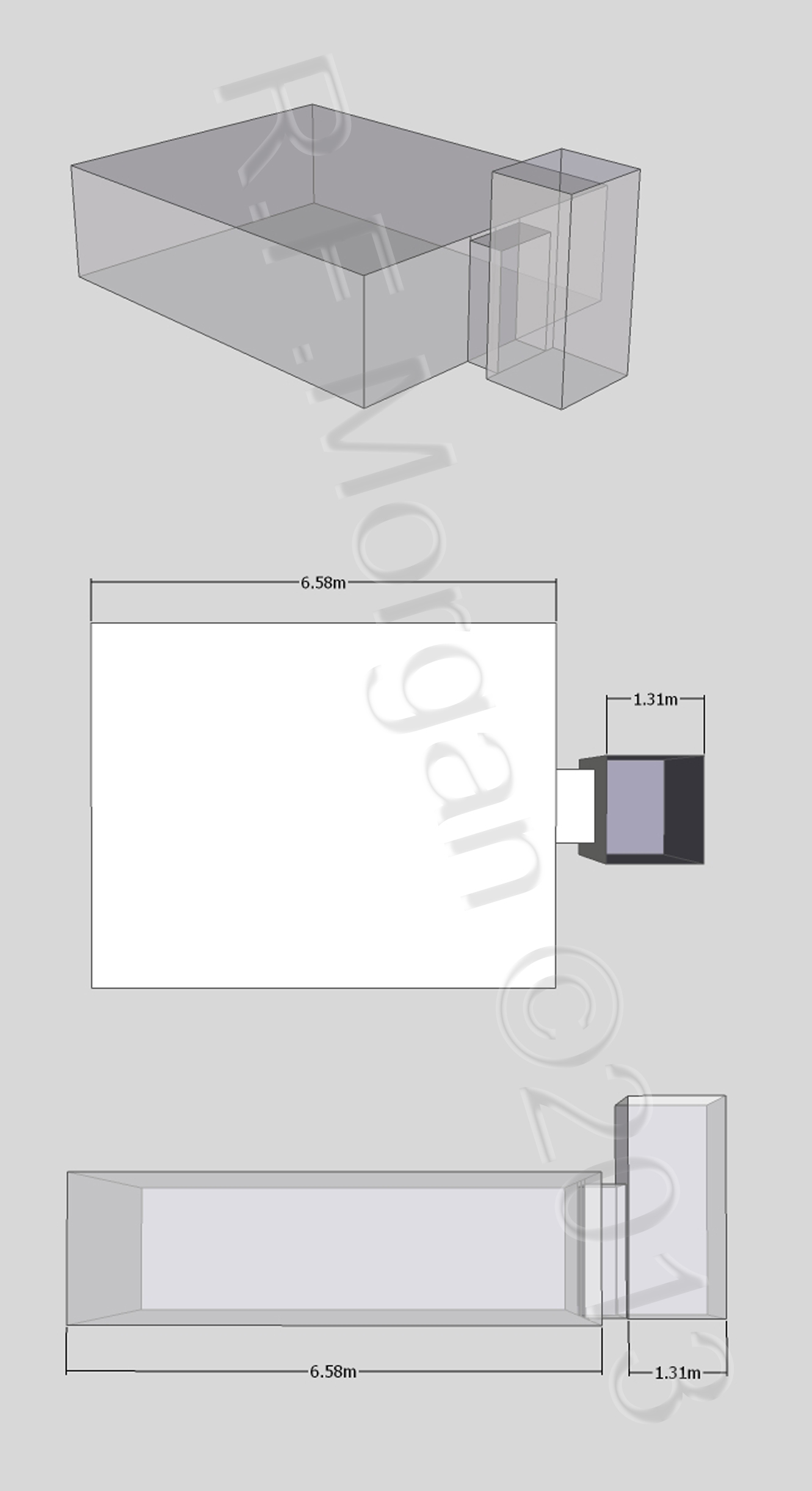
- Schematic of KV53

- Location within Egypt
- Coordinates: 25°44′23.1″N 32°36′2.4″E
- Location: East Valley of the Kings
- Discovered: 1906
- Excavated by: Edward R. Ayrton (1906); Zahi Hawass (2009-10)
- Layout: Shaft and chamber
- ← Previous; KV52 Next → KV54

Tomb KV53 is located in the Valley of the Kings, in Egypt. It was discovered in 1906 by Edward R. Ayrton excavating on behalf of Theodore M. Davis. It has been excavated but never been fully planned, and consists of a single chamber at the end of a shaft.

== 1906 discovery, layout, and contents ==
KV53 was discovered in 1906 by Edward Ayrton during excavations conducted on behalf of the American millionaire Theodore Davis. After thoroughly investigating the southern section of the side valley leading to the tomb of Amenhotep II (KV35), excavation moved to the other side of the path, to the north of KV29. KV53 was discovered underneath later workmens' huts.

The tomb consists of a shallow shaft that descends to a large room. Ayrton notes the tomb had been looted in antiquity, with the only find noted being an ostracon dedicated to Meretseger naming "Hora, chief scribe of the Place of Truth". Several more ostraca had been found in the shaft fill, and more still which were likely contemporary with them had been used to construct the walls of the workers' dwellings.

== 2009–10 excavations ==
In 2009–2010 a team led by Zahi Hawass and Ahmed el-Leithy conducted excavations in this area attempting to relocate tombs KV50, KV51, KV52 and KV53. The digging revealed 18th Dynasty blue painted pottery, tools, and hieratic and figured ostraca including a sketch of a seated queen presenting an offering, and depictions of sexual scenes with women and animals. Cartouches of Ramesses II were also present on ostraca.
