= KV58 =

Ancient Egyptian "Chariot Tomb"

KV58 (Chariot Tomb)
- Burial site of unknown
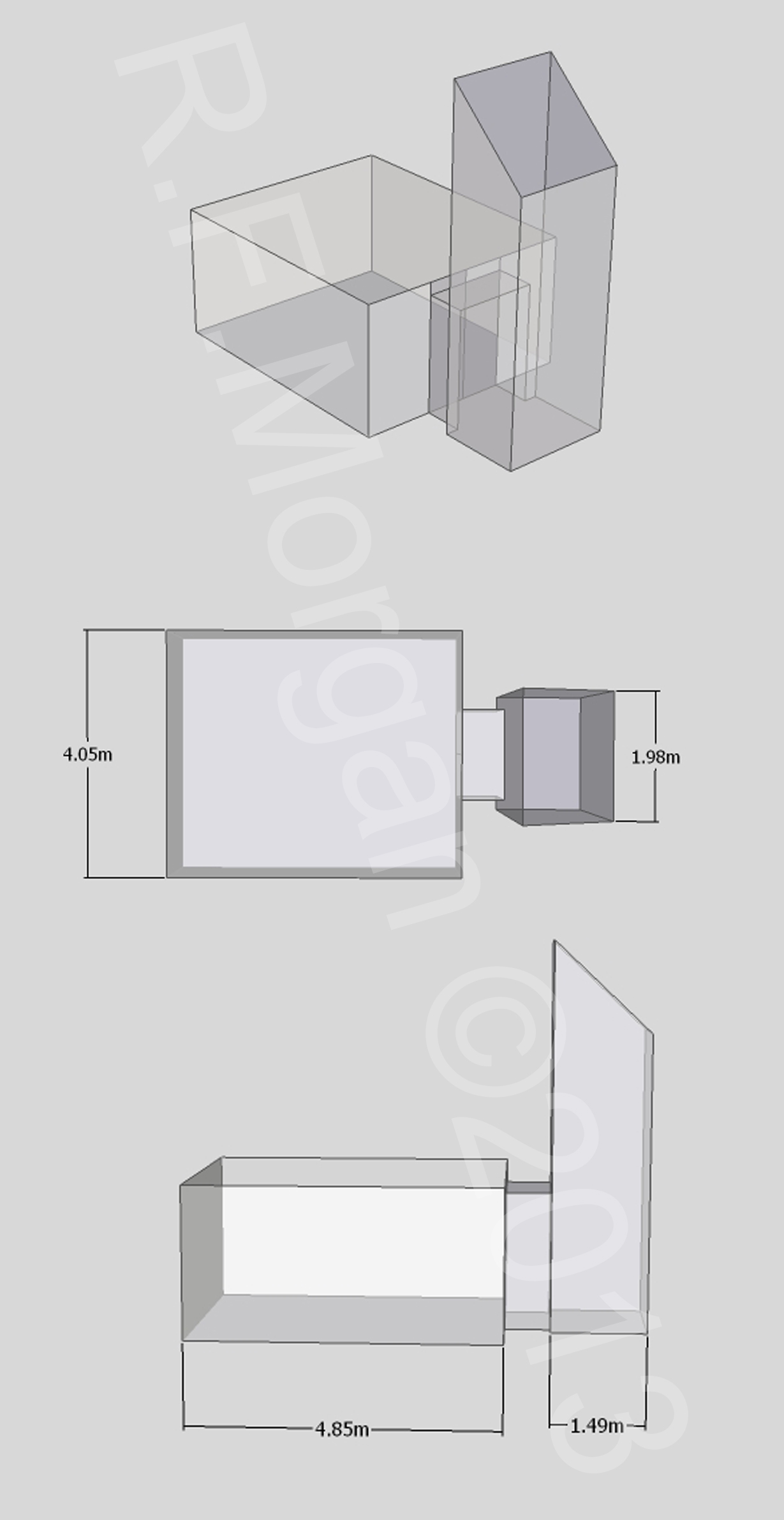
- Schematic of KV58

- Location within Egypt
- Coordinates: 25°44′23.8″N 32°36′03.6″E
- Location: East Valley of the Kings
- Discovered: January 1909
- Excavated by: Harold Jones
- Decoration: Undecorated
- Layout: Shaft and chamber
- ← Previous; KV57 Next → KV59

Tomb KV58, also known as the "Chariot Tomb", is located in the Valley of the Kings in Egypt. It was discovered in January 1909 by Harold Jones, excavating on behalf of Theodore M. Davis. The circumstances of the discovery and specifics of the excavation were only given a passing mention in Davis' account, who attributes the discovery to Edward Ayrton in 1907 instead. The tomb consists of a shaft leading to a single chamber and contained only embossed gold foil, furniture knobs, and a single ushabti. The contents likely originated from the Eighteenth Dynasty tomb of Ay in WV23. Davis considered this tomb to be the burial place of the then little-known pharaoh Tutankhamun.

== Discovery, excavation, and contents ==
The tomb was discovered on 10 January 1909 and is located between the tomb of Horemheb (KV57) and the "Gold Tomb" (KV56). Harold Jones encountered the top of the shaft over 20 feet (6.1 m) below ground level. Excavation of the shaft yielded box handles and knobs, pieces of gold foil, small uraei, and pieces of faience inlay, concentrated at a depth of 6 feet (1.8 m). The shaft opened to the west onto a single chamber. The room was filled with 2–3 feet (0.61–0.91 m) of water-deposited fill; this contained more gold foil and an alabaster ushabti. Davis, in his publication, states that the gold foil was found within a broken box, and that the ushabti was "lying on the floor in one corner." Comparison with Jones' journal reveals that this "neat picture...is almost certainly incorrect" with the gold found in the fill of both the shaft and chamber.

Given KV58's proximity to the tomb of Horemheb, it was likely cut as a satellite tomb. The single uninscribed ushabti is possible evidence of an earlier use of the tomb. Davis saw this tomb as the burial place of the then little-known pharaoh Tutankhamun.

The box handles, knobs, and gold foil bear the names of Tutankhamun, Ankhesenamun, and both the royal and non-royal names of Ay. The gold foil is embossed with designs of the king (Tutankhamun or Ay) defeating enemies with both a mace and chariot, trampling enemies as a sphinx, and practicing archery; floral designs are also present. These fragments likely represent the remains of the fittings of at least one chariot. Their ultimate origin is likely the tomb of Ay, WV23, being deposited by robbers into the half filled shaft during the official dismantling of the royal burials at the end of the New Kingdom. If this is the case, its proximity to KV57 may indicate the transfer of Ay's mummy of that tomb, which Reeves suggests was employed as a cache of royal mummies.

== Bibliography ==
- Davis, Theodore M.; Maspero, Gaston; Daressy, George (1912). The Tombs of Harmhabi and Touatânkhamanou (Duckworth 2001 reprint ed.). London: Archibald Constable & Co. Ltd. ISBN 0-7156-3072-5.
- Reeves, C. N. (1981). "A State Chariot from the Tomb of Ay?". Göttinger Miszellen. 46: 11–19.
- Reeves, C. N. (1982). "The Discovery and Clearance of KV58". Göttinger Miszellen. 53.
- Reeves, Nicholas; Wilkinson, Richard H. (1996). The Complete Valley of the Kings: Tombs and Treasures of Egypt's Greatest Pharaohs (2010 paperback ed.). London: Thames and Hudson. ISBN 978-0-500-28403-2.
