= Embalming cache =

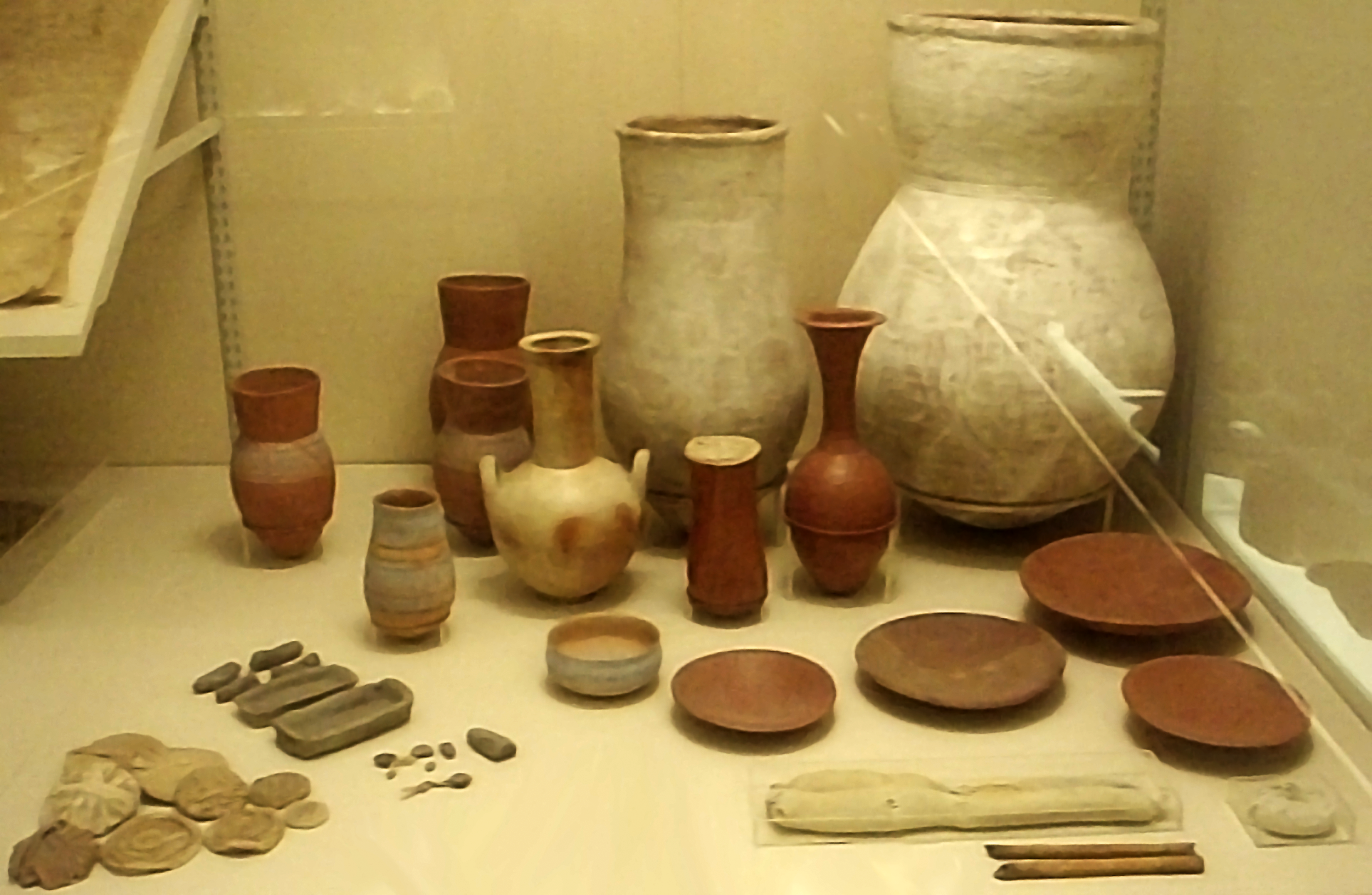
Some of the pottery, dishes and other items found in KV54, the Embalming cache of Tutankhamun, on display at the Metropolitan Museum.

An embalming cache is a collection of material that was used by the ancient Egyptians in the mummification process and then buried either with or separately from the body. It is believed that because the materials had come in contact with the body, they had possibly absorbed part of it, and needed to be buried in order for the body to be complete in the afterlife.

The best known embalming cache is KV54, sometimes called the Embalming cache of Tutankhamun, discovered and excavated by Edward R. Ayrton in 1907. Theodore M. Davis showed the find to Herbert E. Winlock who could not see much in it at that time, so Davis donated the whole lot to the Metropolitan Museum of Art in 1909. In 1940, Winlock took the matter up again and bones from food in a storage jar were examined in the American Museum of Natural History as well as analysis of the bandages made. The hieratic and hieroglyphic inscriptions from the cache have been discussed by scholars of that time. Winlock presented the results 1942 in his book Material used at the embalming of king Tut-Ankh-Amun. Not so much a tomb as a pit, it contained about a dozen large sealed storage jars. Within them were contained pottery, dishes, bags of natron, animal bones, floral collars and linen containing text dated to the final years of the then little-known 18th Dynasty Pharaoh Tutankhamun. It was later determined that that material not only contained material used in the embalming process (such as bags of natron and linen), but the remains of food used in the funerary banquet held at the conclusion of the pharaoh's interment. When Tutankhamun's tomb was discovered in 1922, many small items similar to those found in the KV54 cache were found in the initial entryway, leading to the suggestion that following the initial robbery of the tomb, the embalming materials and burial party refuse were moved to KV54.

Tomb KV63, in the Valley of the Kings, is also thought by many to be another embalming cache. Like the KV54 cache, it contained no mummies, but its many jars contained similar materials, including natron, wood, seeds, shells, carbon, assorted pottery, small animal bones, papyrus fragments, mud trays, mud seals, and pieces of twine or rope.

Not all embalming materials were necessarily kept separate from their owners. At least two non-royal interments in the Valley of the Kings, KV36 (The Tomb of Maiherpri), and KV46 (Tomb of Yuya and Thuya), contained dozens of jars within their tombs holding embalming refuse.
