= E. Harold Jones =

British egyptologist (1877–1911)

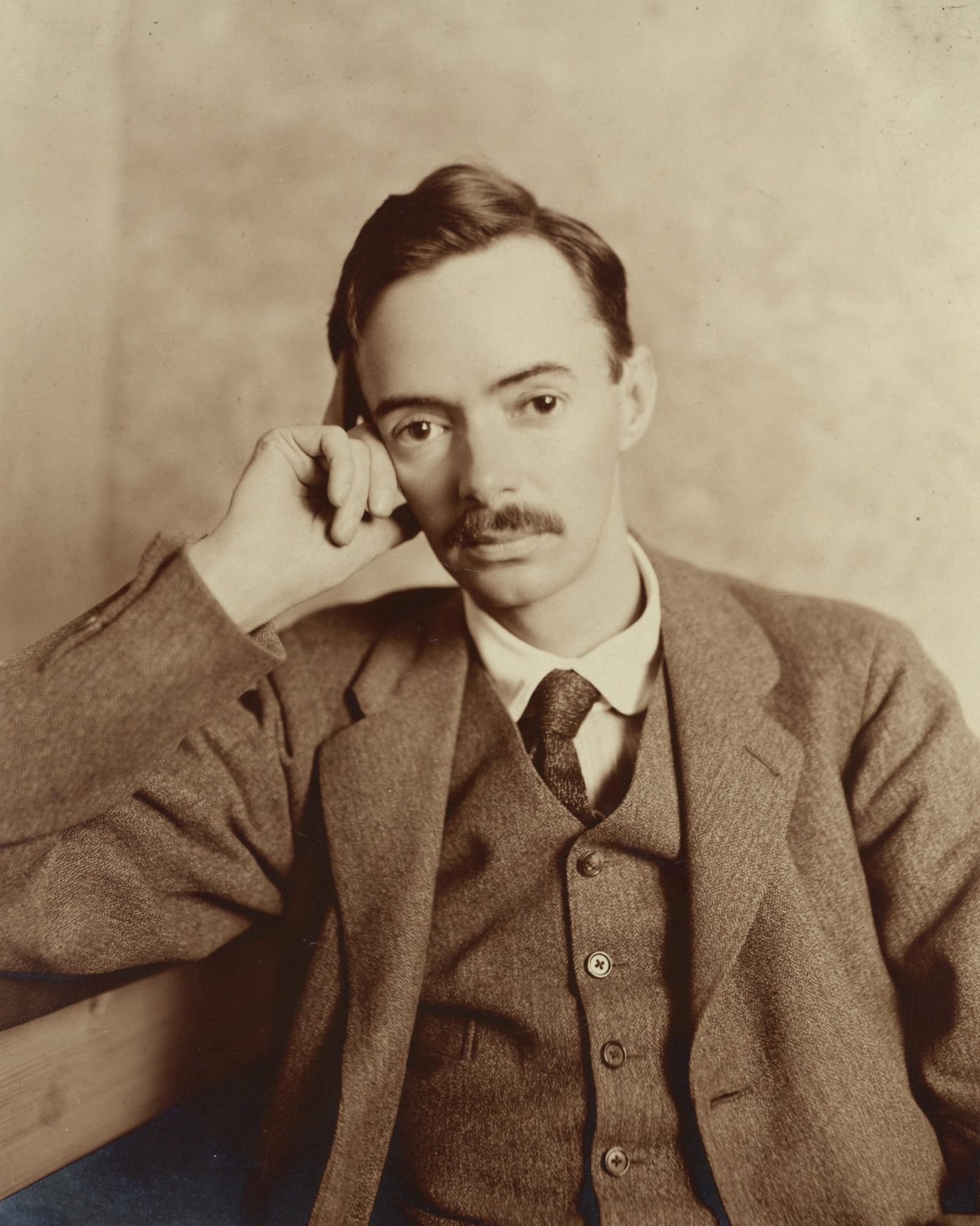
E. Harold Jones

Ernest Harold Jones (7 March 1877 – 10 March 1911) was a British artist and excavator, who identified early clues to the location of Tutankhamun's tomb. He contracted tuberculosis and in 1904 he decided to go to Egypt to relieve his symptoms. He worked with archaeologist John Garstang, of Liverpool, from 1904–07 and then for Theodore M. Davis and Emma Andrews from 1907-11. He died of tuberculosis in Luxor, Egypt, in March 1911.

== Early life and education ==
Ernest Harold Jones was born in Barnsley, South Yorkshire on 7 March 1877 to William Jones and Mary Anne Sprake, both of Welsh heritage. His father was the first Headmaster of the Barnsley School of Art and then returned to Wales as Head of the Carmarthen School of Art. Jones was educated at Queen Elizabeth's Grammar School in Carmarthen. By the time he was 18, he was teaching at the Carmarthen School of Art.

In 1902, Jones won a scholarship to the Royal College of Art in London. By 1904, his health had deteriorated so much from tuberculosis that he had to leave London. He was a good enough artist that he was able to join John Garstang's excavations in Egypt that same year.

== Work in Egypt ==
Jones began work with John Garstang of Liverpool in the 1903-04 season, but in the 1904-05 season became an excavator and an illustrator of the project at Beni Hasan. In July 1904, there was an exhibition at the Society of Antiquaries of London. Jones' paintings of artifacts, Egyptian landscapes, and some of the excavation staff were displayed.

Jones continued working for Garstang until 1907, but quickly grew tired of the isolation of the sites of Abydos and Beni Hasan. The American millionaires Theodore Davis and Emma Andrews offered him more money for less work in the bustling town of Luxor, and by February 1907, he was working for them.

Jones worked on their excavations in the Valley of the Kings, for which Davis and Andrews held the concession. Jones worked mostly on their houseboat, the dahabeyah Beduin, painting larger objects coming out of tombs they cleared in the Valley. He worked with Davis and Andrews on notable excavations of KV 54 and KV 55. He wrote a number of letters home to his family, remarking on the friendships he made with the Davis and Andrews crew. He appreciated their friendship and care, and looked forward to many years of work with them.

== Death ==
In the 1910-11 season, he returned to Luxor to work with Davis and Andrews again. He had planned on writing a book about his experience and publishing more of his paintings. But his tuberculosis had become so bad he could hardly leave his bed. He died in Luxor on 10 March 1911. Lord Carnarvon and Howard Carter organised his funeral and he is buried in the Christian Cemetery in Luxor.

== Commemoration and legacy ==
In September 2023, a blue plaque was unveiled in Sackville Street, Barnsley, the home where he was born.

His portrait by Ernest H. D. Lloyd is held in the collection of the National Library of Wales. His painting A Carmarthenshire cornfield (1903) is held by Amgueddfa Cymru and Still Life: Chalice, Plate and Tankard by Carmarthenshire County Museum. The paintings were donated by his sister Annie, more formally known as Miss M. A. Sprake Jones, of Bryn Myrddin, Abergwili, who donated art and some of the egyptology items, (including items from the tomb of Queen Tiye) which he brought home to a number of Welsh museums.
