= KV50 =

Ancient Egyptian "animal tomb"

- Burial site of animals
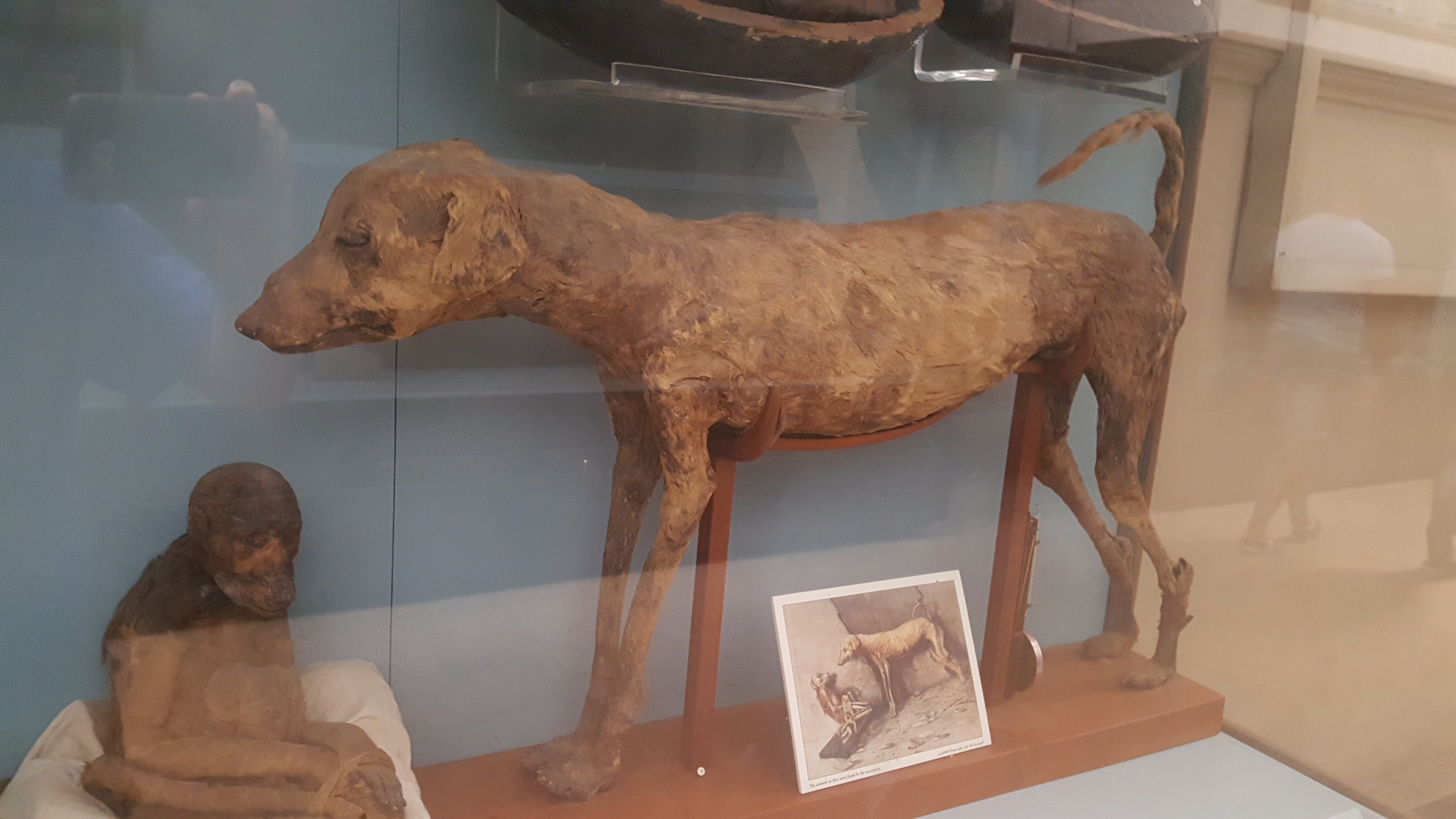
- Mummified dog and monkey (Egyptian Museum, Cairo)

- Location within Egypt
- Coordinates: 25°44′23.2″N 32°36′1.3″E
- Location: East Valley of the Kings
- Discovered: January 1906
- Excavated by: Edward R. Ayrton
- Layout: Shaft and chamber
- ← Previous; KV49 Next → KV51

Tomb KV50 is located in the Valley of the Kings, in Egypt. It was discovered in 1906 by Edward R. Ayrton excavating on behalf of Theodore M. Davis. Together with KV51 and KV52, it forms a group known as the "Animal Tombs". It contained the burial of a dog mummy and a mummified monkey and is probably associated with the nearby tomb of Amenhotep II (KV35).

== Location, discovery, and contents ==
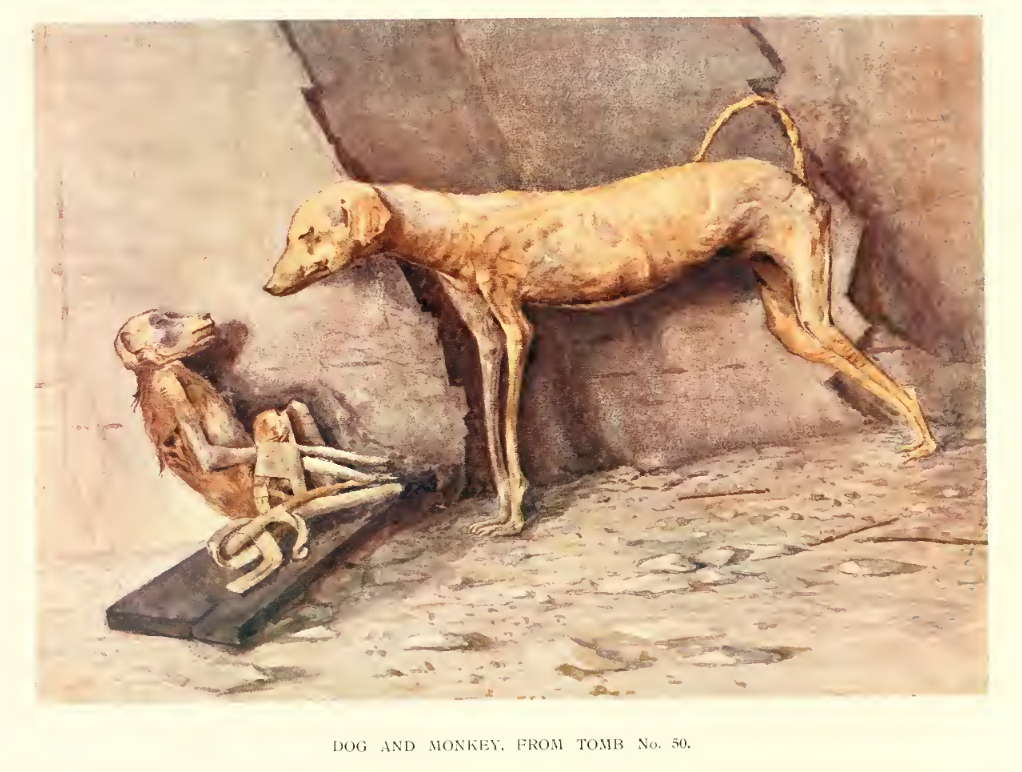
Painting by Harold Jones of the unwrapped dog and monkey mummies in KV50

The tomb is located on the same rocky promontory as KV49, in the side valley that leads towards KV35. It is at a slightly higher level than KV49, and is located to the west of that tomb. KV50 was the first of a cluster of three tombs discovered by Edward R. Ayrton in his clearance of this part of the valley on behalf of Theodore Davis. The entrance was buried under 6 feet (1.8 m) of debris.

The tomb consists of a shaft, 12 feet (3.7 m) deep and 4 feet (1.2 m) square, which opens to the south onto a chamber 19 feet (5.8 m) long and 6–8 feet (1.8–2.4 m) wide. This was found partly filled with debris from the shaft.

Ayrton noted that the tomb had been thoroughly robbed in antiquity, though from the presence of wooden fragments it likely once held a coffin. No trace was found of the tomb owner's name. The only occupants of the chamber were two animal mummies, posed against one wall.

Propped up against the eastern wall was a large dog, quite perfect although stripped of its wrappings, and a monkey still partially wrapped.

The tomb, along with KV51 and KV52, seem to have formed a burial ground for royal pets.

== Recent excavations ==
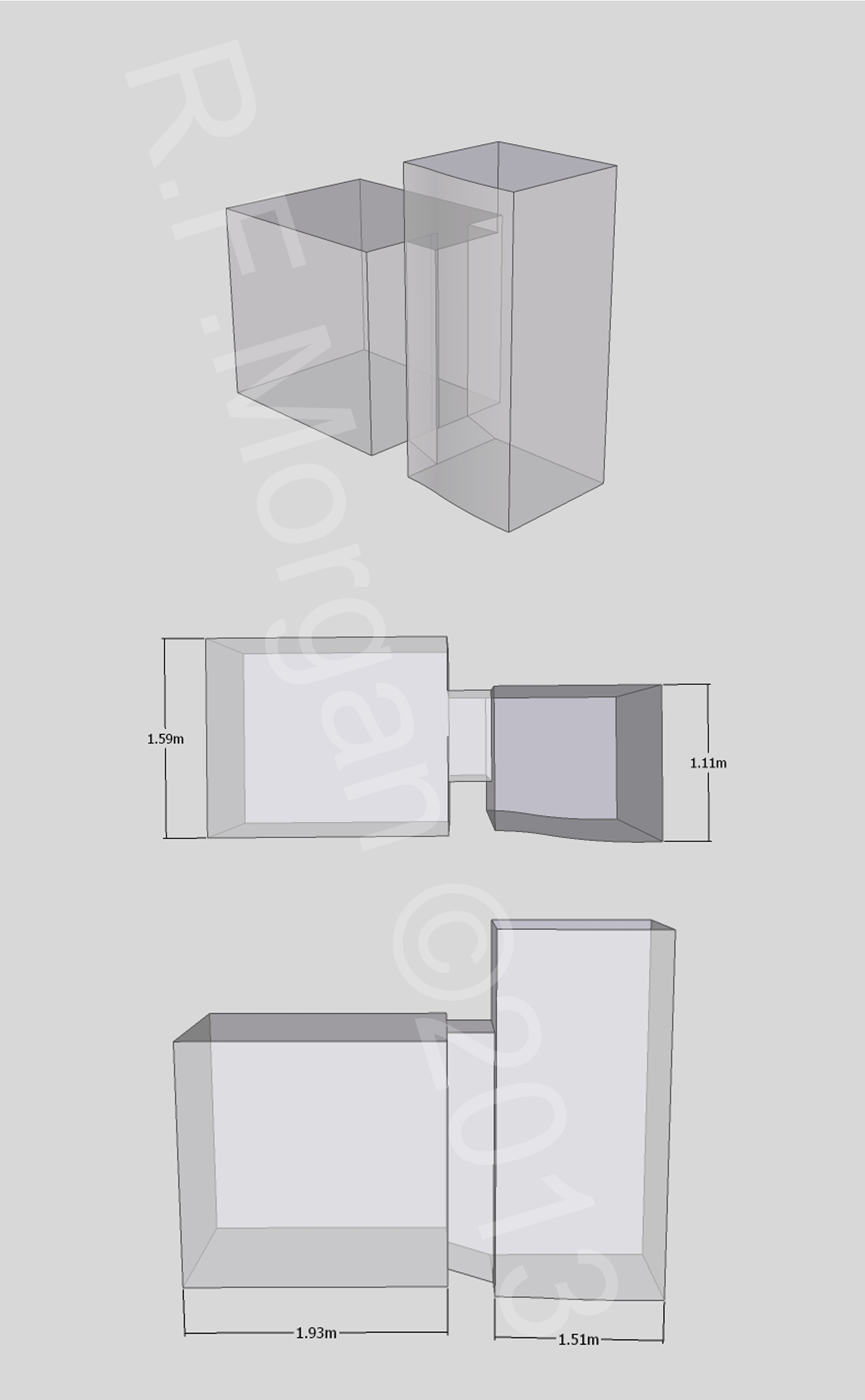
Schematic of KV50

This area was excavated in winter 2009–2010 by a team led by Zahi Hawass and Ahmed el-Leithy in an effort to relocate KV50, KV51, KV52 and KV53. This excavation revealed Eighteenth Dynasty pottery, tools, and ostraca including figured examples which included a sketch of a seated queen presenting an offering, depictions of sexual scenes with women and animals, and cartouches of Ramesses II.
