= KV52 =

Ancient Egyptian "animal tomb"

- Burial site of animals
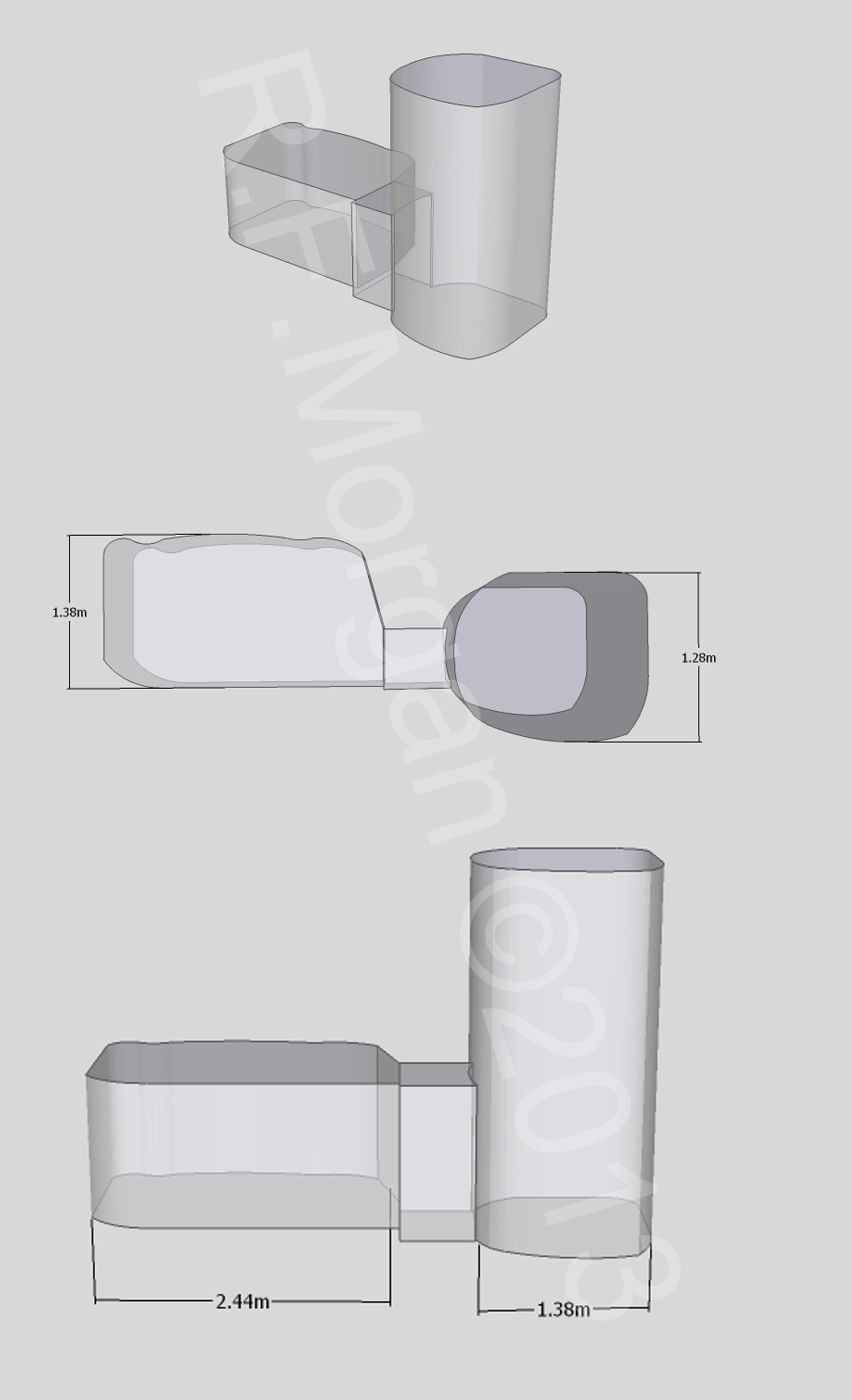
- Schematic of KV52

- Location within Egypt
- Coordinates: 25°44′23.2″N 32°36′1.3″E
- Location: East Valley of the Kings
- Discovered: January 1906
- Excavated by: Edward R. Ayrton
- Layout: Shaft and chamber
- ← Previous; KV51 Next → KV53

Tomb KV52 is located in the Valley of the Kings, in Egypt. It was discovered in 1906 by Edward R. Ayrton excavating on behalf of Theodore M. Davis. Together with KV50 and KV51 it forms a group known as the "Animal Tombs", it contained a mummified monkey, and is probably associated with the nearby tomb of Amenhotep II (KV35).

== Location, discovery, and contents ==
The tomb is located on the same rocky promontory as KV49, on the south side of the valley that leads towards KV35; it is cut at a slightly higher level than KV49 and is located near to KV50 and KV51. KV52 was the third in this cluster of three tombs discovered by Edward R. Ayrton in his methodical clearance of this part of the valley on behalf of Theodore Davis. He found the entrance to be buried under 6 feet (1.8 m) of debris.

The tomb consists of a shaft 9.6 feet (2.9 m) deep that opens onto a single chamber measuring 8 by 5 feet (2.4 m × 1.5 m). Ayrton found the tomb to be "absolutely empty except for two boxes, one of which was almost double the size of the other." Both were black and entirely undecorated. The larger box contained the mummy of a monkey, lying unwrapped amongst its wrappings. The smaller box was a canopic chest, as it was divided internally into four compartments.

== Recent excavations ==
In the winter of 2009–2010, a team led by Zahi Hawass and Ahmed el-Leithy attempted to relocate tombs KV50, KV51, KV52 and KV53. The excavations uncovered Eighteenth Dynasty blue painted pottery, tools and hieratic and figured ostraca which included a sketch of a seated queen presenting an offering, depictions of sexual scenes with women and animals, as well as cartouches of Ramesses II.
