= Davis Madonna =

Painting by Gentile da Fabriano

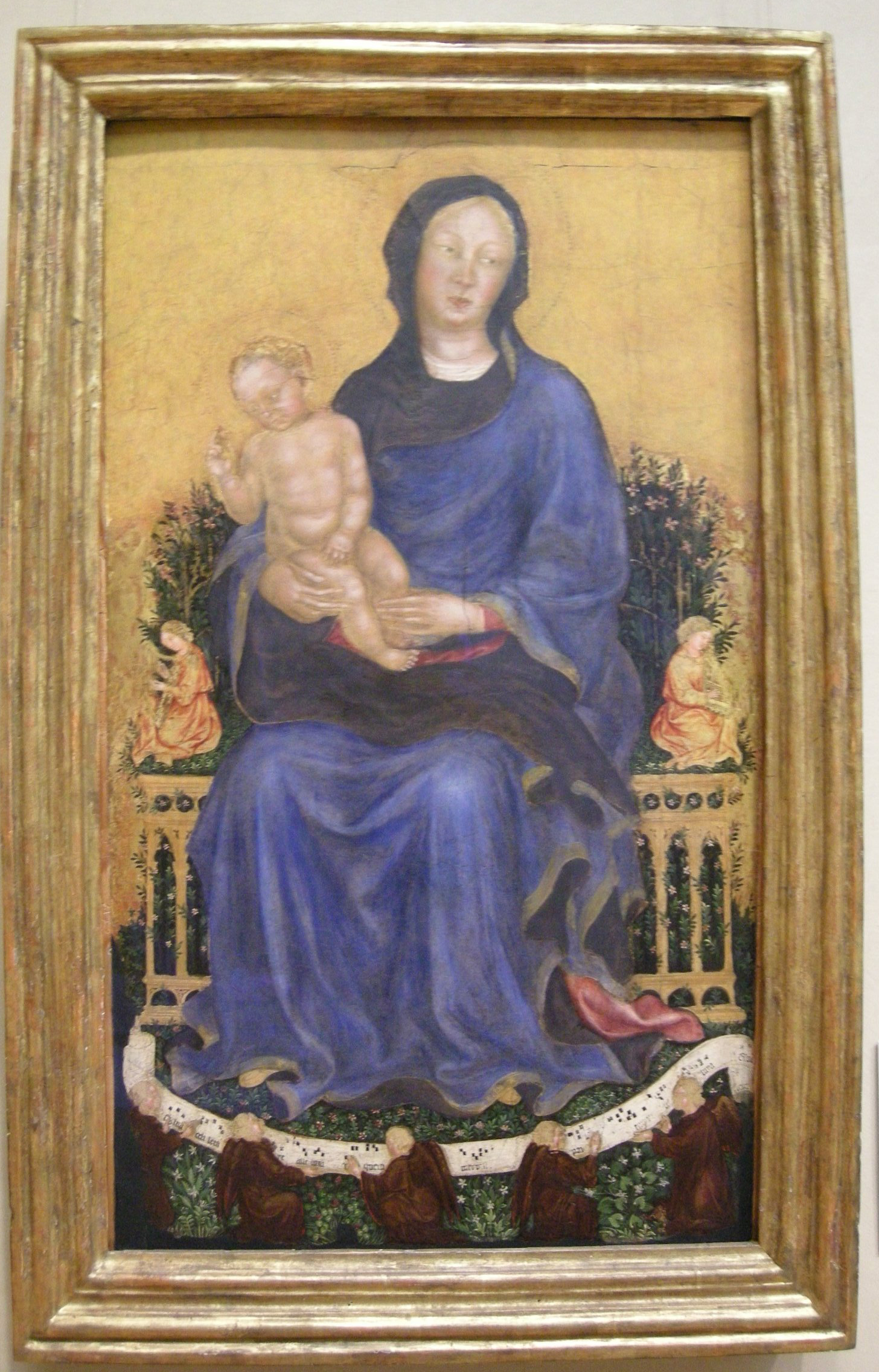
- Artist: Gentile da Fabriano
- Year: c. 1410
- Medium: tempera on panel
- Dimensions: 85.7 cm × 50.8 cm (33.7 in × 20.0 in)
- Location: Metropolitan Museum of Art, New York

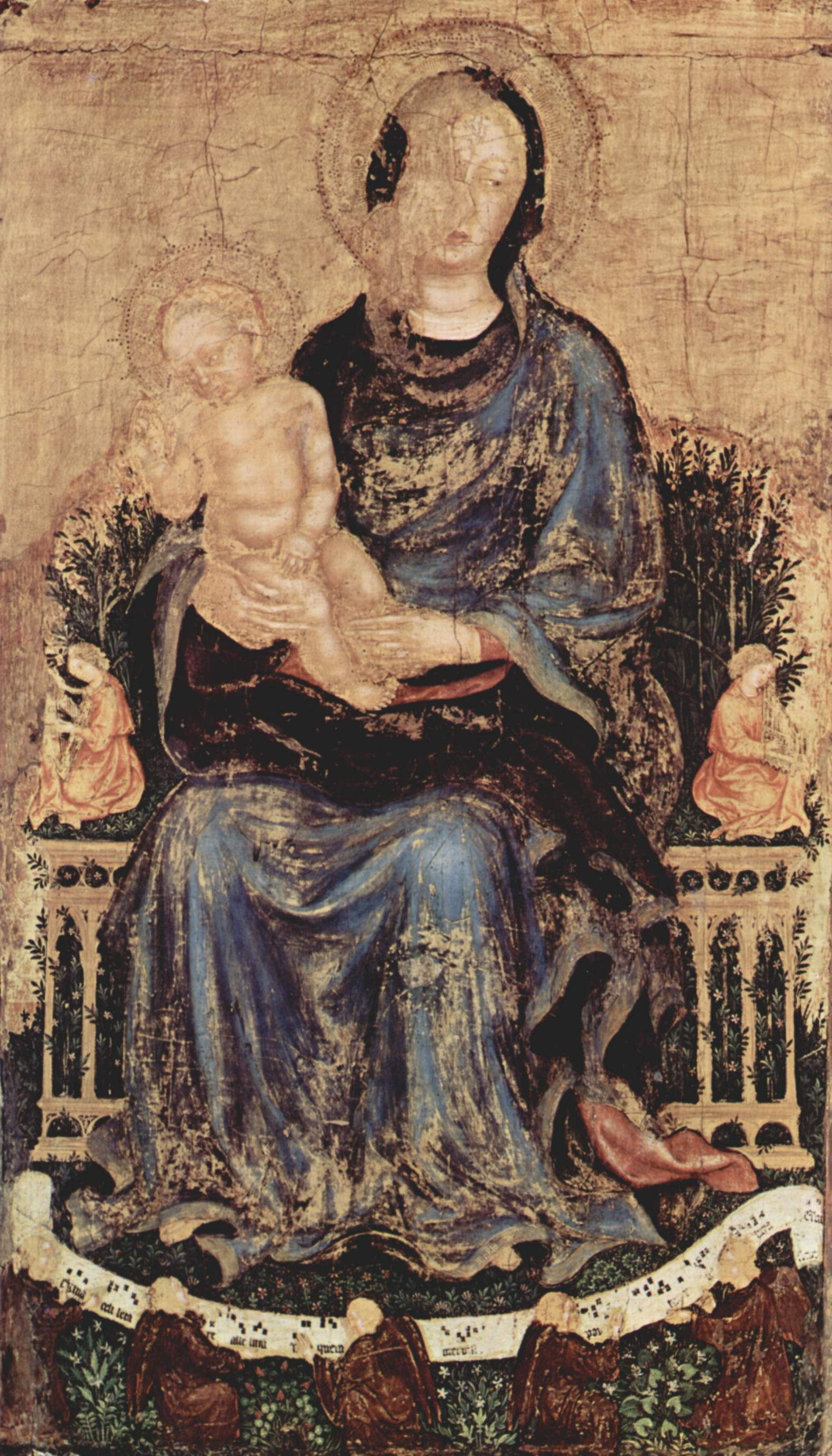
The painting before restoration

The Davis Madonna is a tempera on panel painting by the Italian artist Gentile da Fabriano, created c. 1410. It is held in the Metropolitan Museum of Art, in New York. The painting is named after Theodore M. Davis who acquired it in Florence, early in the 20th century before leaving it to its present owner in 1915.

== Description ==
The painting is in a bad state of conservation, but improved by restoration work. The Virgin Mary is seen seated on a slender throne pierced with arches and Gothic decorations, which is reminiscent of the Venetian tradition (both architectural and goldsmith's), from which dense foliage of shrubs sprout. She looks to the right, while the Child blesses on the left, suggesting that some side compartments were once also present. It is a variant on the artist's Perugia Madonna, painted just before it. The 'plant throne' merges the iconography of the Maestà's throne with the Madonna of Humility sat on the earth, due also to the similarity between the Latin words humus ("meadow") and humilitas ("humility"). At the base there are small musical angels and a scroll bearing the Regina caeli, an Easter antiphon that reads: "[R]egina c[o]eli l[a] eta re alleluia [quia] quem meruist [i] por tar[e a]ll[e]luya [r]esur [rexit] / sicut".
