= KV51 =

Ancient Egyptian "animal tombs"

- Burial site of animals
- Mummified monkeys from KV51

- Location within Egypt
- Coordinates: 25°44′23.2″N 32°36′1.3″E
- Location: East Valley of the Kings
- Discovered: January 1906
- Excavated by: Edward R. Ayrton
- Layout: Shaft and chamber
- ← Previous; KV50 Next → KV52

Tomb KV51 is located in the Valley of the Kings, in Egypt. It was discovered in 1906 by Edward R. Ayrton excavating on behalf of Theodore M. Davis. The tomb, together with KV50 and KV52 forms a group of three known as the "Animal Tombs". It contained the burials of three monkeys, one baboon, one ibis and three ducks, and is probably associated with the nearby tomb of Amenhotep II (KV35).

== Location, discovery, and contents ==
The tomb is located on the same rocky promontory as KV49, in the side valley that leads towards KV35; it is cut at a slightly higher level than KV49 and is located slightly to the north of KV50. KV51 is the second of a cluster of three tombs discovered by Edward R. Ayrton in his methodical clearance of this part of the valley on behalf of Theodore Davis. He found the entrance to be buried under 6 feet (1.8 m) of debris.

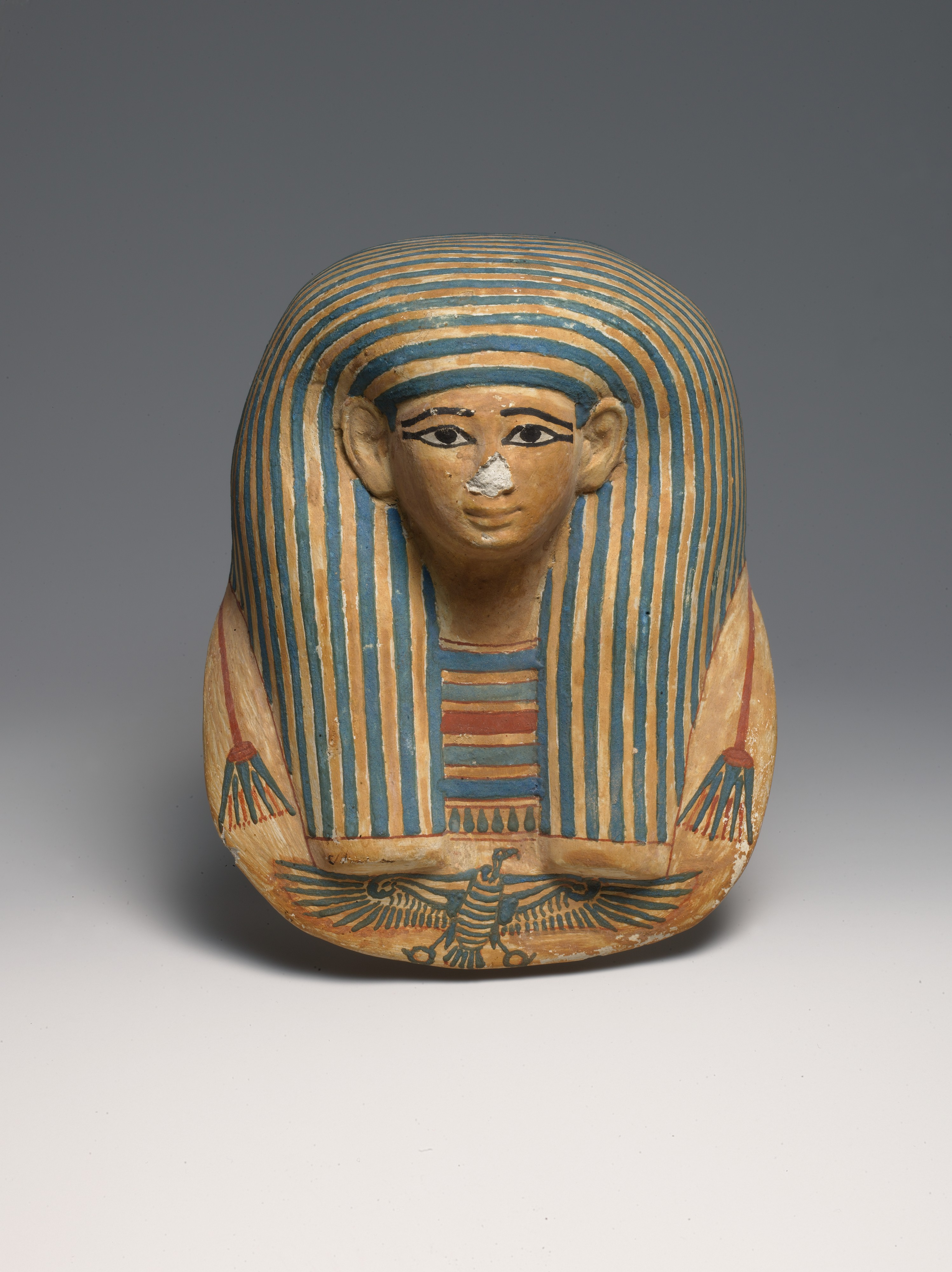
The miniature mask that likely topped a canopic package

The tomb consists of a short shaft which opens to the south onto a single small chamber. This entrance was found closed with stacked stones and the lid of a coffin, though some fill from the shaft had entered the tomb. The room was found "completely filled up with animals, all of which had originally been mummified and done up in cloth wrappings." Immediately to the right were two monkeys, one wrapped, one partially unwrapped, sitting in an upright position against the wall. Along the south wall was another monkey whose head had been unwrapped, and an unwrapped ibis mummy sitting in a pile of bandages, along with a black-coloured box coffin. In the corner of the east wall was a "perfect specimen" of a baboon, unwrapped, and wearing a necklace of blue beads. Lastly were the bodies of three mummified ducks. Ayrton noted that the mummies were likely fully or partially unwrapped by robbers searching for precious jewellery worn by the animals.

Also found were some wrapped organ packages made into the shape of mummies; a small human-headed mask, made of plaster and brightly painted, found nearby likely fitted one of the bundles. This treatment allowed Ayrton to date it to the Eighteenth Dynasty. The wrapped organs of Thuya, mother of Queen Tiye, were found similarly dressed in her KV46 tomb a year prior.

== Recent excavations ==
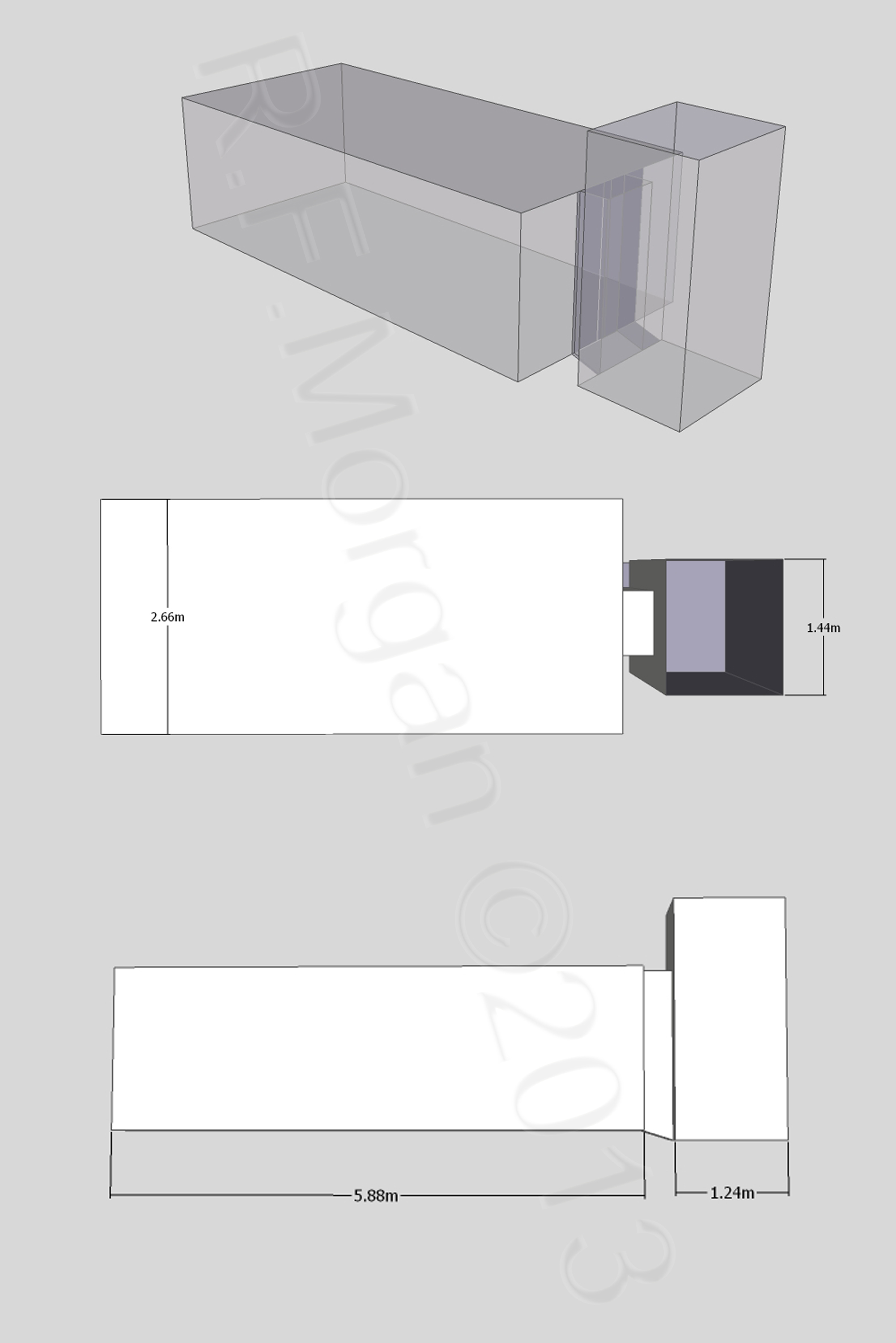
Schematic of KV51

In the winter of 2009–2010, a Supreme Council of Antiquities team attempted to relocate tombs KV50, KV51, KV52 and KV53. The excavation revealed Eighteenth Dynasty blue painted pottery, tools, and ostraca bearing hieratic writing and images, including a sketch of a seated queen presenting an offering and depictions of sexual scenes with women and animals. Ostraca with the cartouches of Ramesses II were also found.
