= KV54 =

Egyptian tomb containing Tutankhamun's embalming cache

- Burial site of Tutankhamun's embalming cache
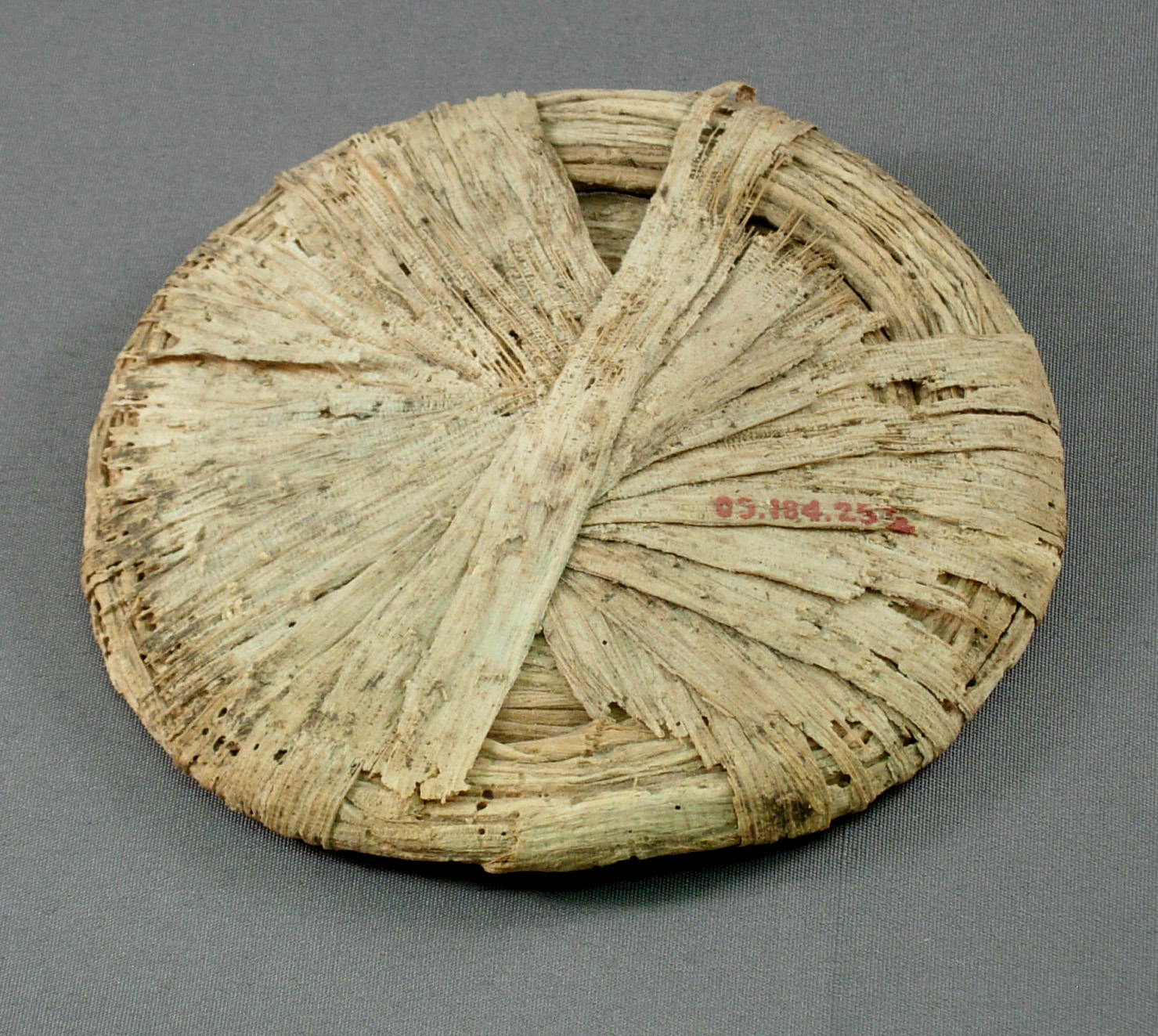
- Papyrus lid from KV54, Tutankhamun's embalming cache (Metropolitan Museum)

- Location within Egypt
- Coordinates: 25°44′22.5″N 32°36′08.2″E
- Location: East Valley of the Kings
- Discovered: 21 December 1907
- Excavated by: Edward R. Ayrton for Theodore M. Davis
- Layout: Square pit
- ← Previous; KV53 Next → KV55

Tomb KV54 is located in the Valley of the Kings, in Egypt. It was originally excavated by Edward R. Ayrton on behalf of the American lawyer Theodore M. Davis, who funded the work.

== History ==
Not as much a tomb as a small pit located near the tomb of Seti I, it contained about a dozen large sealed storage jars. Within the jars were equipment and objects that had been carefully packed. It contained pottery, dishes, bags of natron, animal bones, floral collars and linen containing text dated to the final years of the then (1907) little-known pharaoh Tutankhamun.

In 1909, Davis donated the finds he was allowed to take out of Egypt (the contents of six of the storage jars), which were of little intrinsic value, to the Metropolitan Museum of Art in New York City, where they now reside on display. Davis declared to the press that he had found the tomb of Tutankhamun, and he published his findings in a book called The Tombs of Harmhabi and Touatankhamanou (using the then-current French spellings for the pharaohs Horemheb and Tutankhamun respectively) in 1912.

One of the critical finds from KV54 was a piece of linen marked with hieratic text saying "The good god, Lord of the Two Lands, Nebkheperure [the prenomen of Tutankhamun], beloved of Min. Linen of year 6." Recognizing that KV54 did not represent Tutankhamun's actual tomb, and that it did signal the existence of a yet-to-be discovered tomb, archaeologist Howard Carter, who would eventually find the real Tomb of Tutankhamun, corresponded with the Metropolitan Museum's Egyptological Director Herbert Winlock on this subject in 1915.

In 1923, Winlock, who had subsequently found similar contents in other excavations throughout the Theban Necropolis, instead identified the contents of KV54 not as an actual tomb, but an embalming cache, representing the refuse left over from the mummification of the pharaoh, rather than his "tomb". The food and other related items likely came from a funerary banquet held at the pharaoh's interment. He estimated that there had been a total of eight official mourners who had attended the burial.

When the tomb of Tutankhamun was discovered in 1922, similar items were found in the entrance corridor, and it is thought that after the first robbery attempt of the tomb, the embalming cache material was moved to the pit that was KV54, and the corridor filled with rocky debris in order to stop future robbery attempts.

== Gallery of images ==
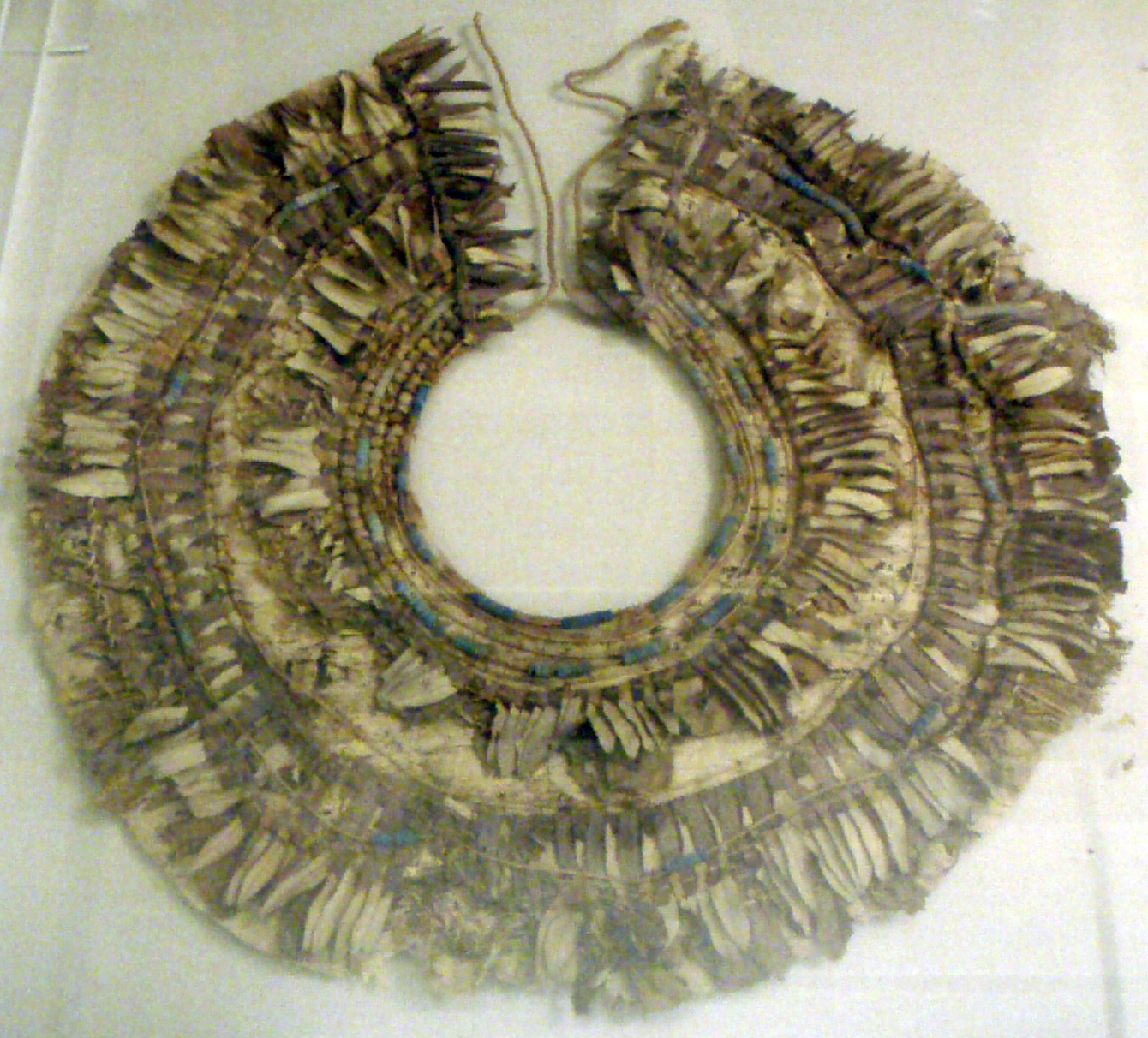
Floral collar found in tomb KV54, on display at the Metropolitan Museum of Art in New York City.

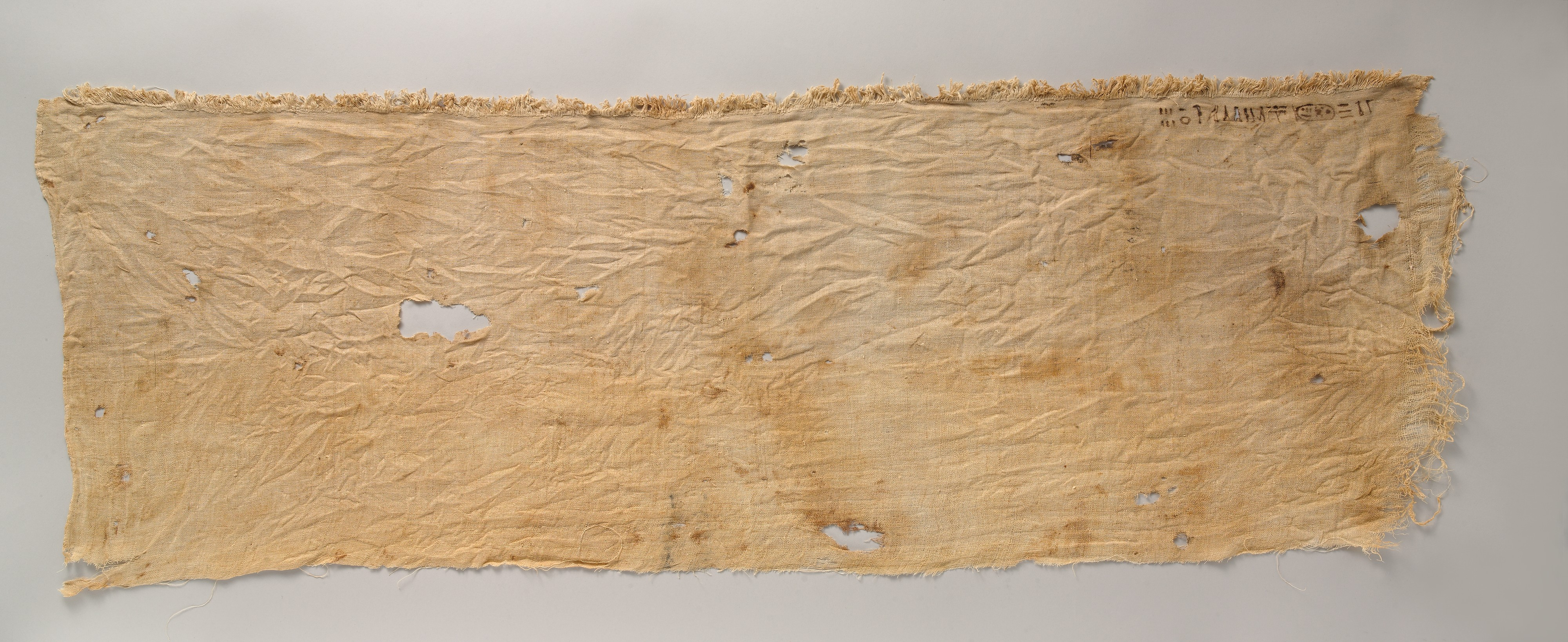
Linen from KV54 containing hieratic writing bearing Tutankhamen's prenomen (Nebkheperure) and the regnal date Year 6, on display at the Metropolitan Museum of Art in New York City.

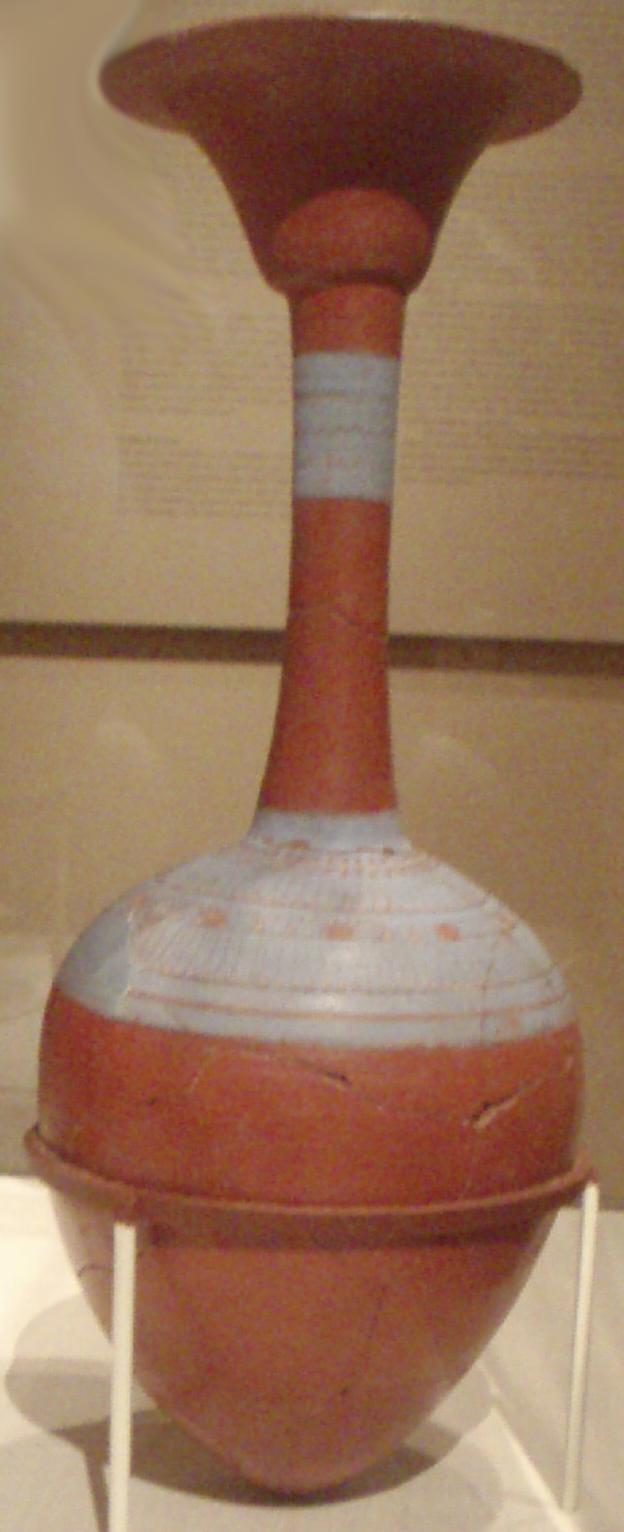
A long-necked bottle with a decorative floral pattern from KV54, on display at the Metropolitan Museum of Art in New York City.

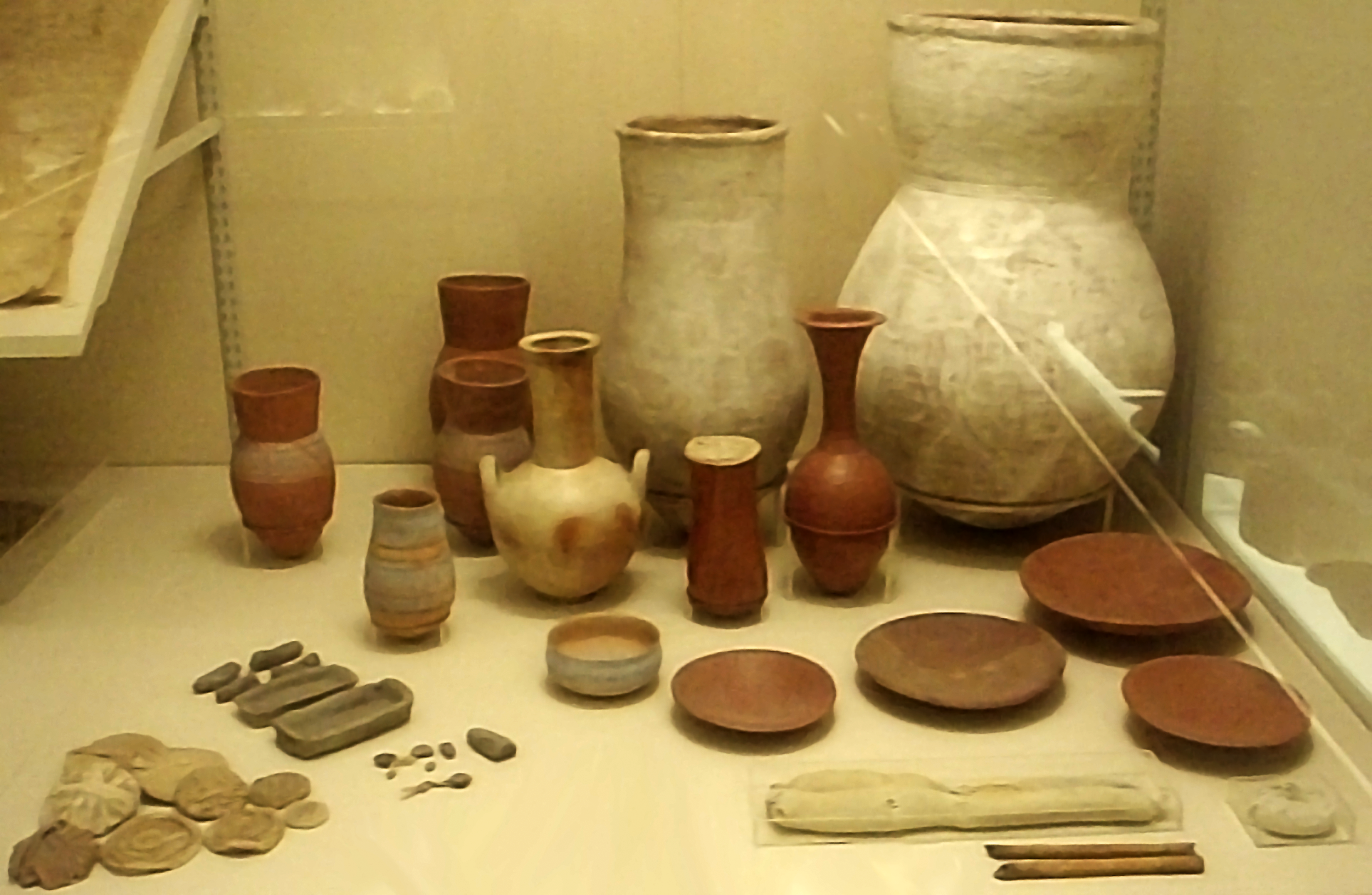
Pottery, dishes and other miscellaneous items from KV54, on display at the Metropolitan Museum of Art in New York City.
