= KV55 =

Egyptian tomb possibly of Pharaoh Akhenaten

- Burial site of Amarna cache
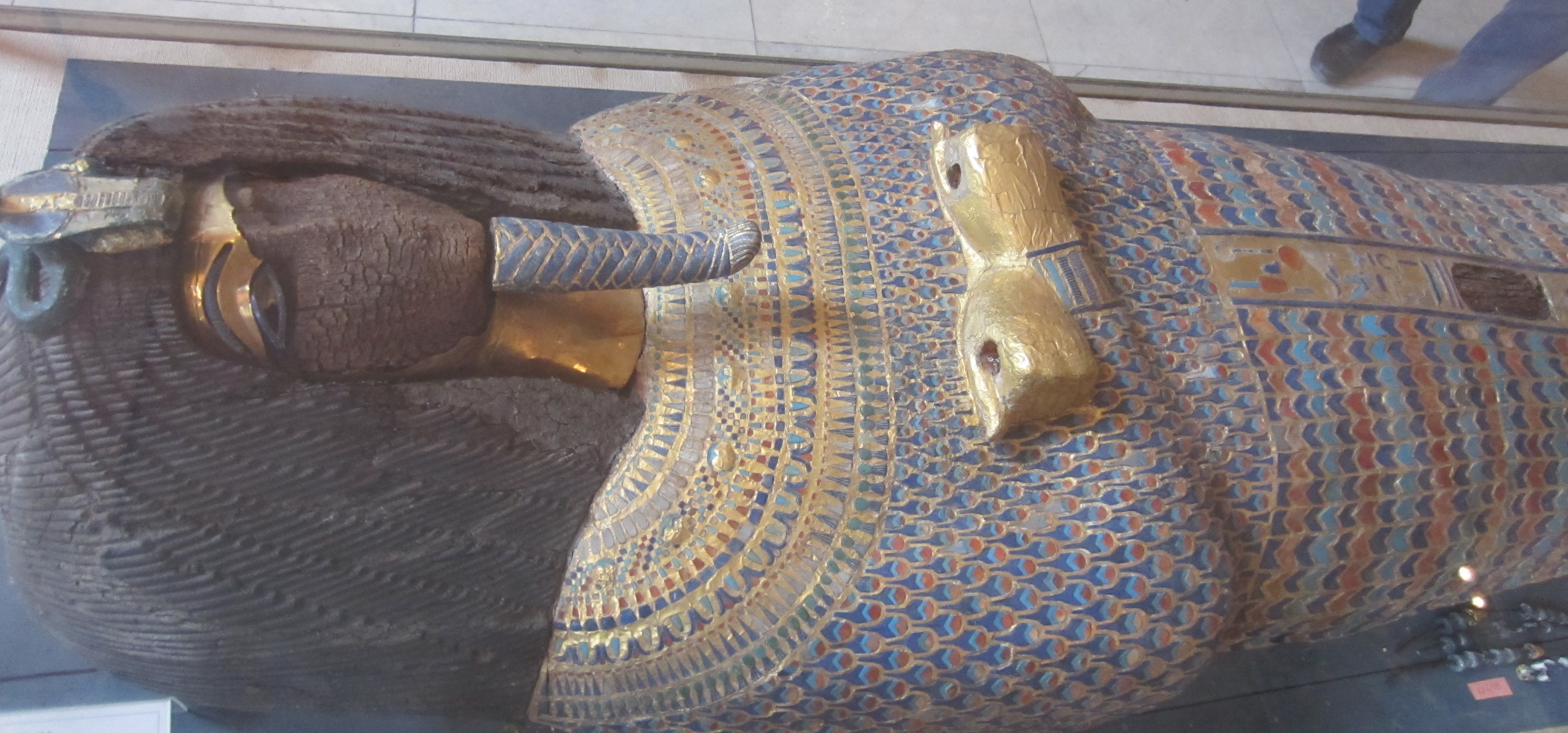
- Gilded and inlaid wooden coffin from KV55, now in the Egyptian Museum of Antiquities in Cairo. The face and the cartouche containing the name of the coffin's occupant were defaced in ancient times, suggesting that the body inside was that of Akhenaten.

- Location within Egypt
- Coordinates: 25°44′25.3″N 32°36′06.0″E
- Location: East Valley of the Kings
- Discovered: 6 January 1907
- Excavated by: Edward R. Ayrton (1907–08); Lyla Pinch Brock (1992–93)
- Layout: Straight axis
- ← Previous; KV54 Next → KV56

KV55 is a tomb in the Valley of the Kings in Egypt. It was discovered by Edward R. Ayrton in 1907 while he was working in the Valley for Theodore M. Davis. It has long been speculated, as well as much disputed, that the body found in this tomb was that of the famous king, Akhenaten, who moved the capital to Akhetaten (modern-day Amarna). The results of genetic and other scientific tests published in February 2010 have suggested that the person buried there was both the son of Amenhotep III and the father of Tutankhamun. Furthermore, the study established that the age of this person at the time of his death was consistent with that of Akhenaten, thereby making it almost certain that it is Akhenaten's body. However, a growing body of work soon began to appear to dispute the assessment of the age of the mummy and the identification of KV55 as Akhenaten.

Both the tomb's history and the identification of its single occupant have been problematic. It is presumed to be a royal cache and reburial dating from the late eighteenth dynasty, prepared after the abandonment of Amarna and the dismantling of the royal necropolis there. On the basis of the recovered artifacts, it is also suggested that the burial once contained more than a single occupant, either interred on one occasion or over a period of time. Queen Tiye is most often named in this context.

It is also clear that the tomb was re-opened at a later time, almost certainly during the twentieth dynasty. At that time, any additional, hypothetical occupants of the tomb may have been removed, while the remaining mummy and some of the other artefacts were desecrated and abandoned.

The tomb is often referred to as the "Amarna cache", given the mixed nature of its contents.

== Discovery and excavations ==
The entrance to KV55 was uncovered by Ayrton on 6 January 1907. Its discovery was brought to Davis's attention on the following day. The tomb was first entered on 9 January by Ayrton, Davis, Joseph Lindon Smith and (as the representative of the antiquities service) Arthur Weigall. On 11 January 1907, the finds were photographed. Ayrton then began clearance of the tomb. On 25 January 1907, the coffin and mummy were investigated in situ.

According to a letter from Davis to Gaston Maspero, some of the objects found in KV55 were still in place in January 1908, and their study and attempts at conservation were still ongoing at that later date. In 1921, while excavating south of the tomb, Howard Carter discovered several items that seem to have originated in KV55. These include a jasper burnisher and some fragments of copper rosettes from a funerary pall.

After its excavation, the tomb's entrance was initially fitted with a steel door, which was later removed and replaced by stone blocking. By 1944, this blocking had collapsed and filled the tomb's entrance with debris. In 1993, the tomb was cleared again by Lyla Pinch Brock. In 1996, she undertook conservation work on the stairs and the plastering inside the burial chamber through a grant from the American Research Centre in Egypt.

=== KVC ===
Three days before the discovery of KV55, Ayrton uncovered a recess in the rock (now designated as KVC) located immediately above the entrance to KV55 and containing jars of twentieth dynasty type. This recess may have been an unfinished tomb commencement, and its contents may be analogous to the embalming cache found in KV54, but because the find was never properly published, the precise nature of its contents, the date of the jars, and its relation (if any) to KV55 are now unclear.

== The tomb ==
=== Location and general appearance ===
Tomb layout of KV55 A – Entrance B – Corridor J – Burial chamber Ja – (unfinished) Ante-chamber

KV55 is a relatively small, undecorated, single-chamber tomb, its total length measuring only 27.61 meters. It is located in the central area of the valley, immediately adjacent to and below KV6 (Ramesses IX) and across the valley floor from KV7 (Ramesses II) and the near-contemporary tomb KV62 (Tutankhamun). Oriented almost due east, its entrance way consists of a set of stairs cut into the valley bedrock that leads to a gently sloping corridor and then to the single chamber of the tomb.

The tomb appears to be unfinished: in the south wall of the burial chamber is a small niche, the commencement of an unfinished antechamber, while red masonry marks within the burial chamber indicate plans for yet another room. When finished these would have made the tomb's layout roughly similar to that of the tomb of Tutankhamun. Such a plan seems to indicate that KV55, like KV62, was initially intended as a private burial site and only later taken over for a royal interment.

=== Entranceway ===
The tomb is accessed by a flight of 20 steps, cut into the bedrock and covered by an overhanging rock. An ostracon found by Pinch Brock in 1993 has been interpreted as a plan of the tomb, and possibly indicates a widening of the entrance after its initial cutting. This possibility is also suggested by mason's marks found on the walls by the tomb entrance. It appears that the stairwell has been enlarged, its ceiling raised, and the number of steps increased.

When the tomb was discovered in 1907, the stairwell was covered with debris, probably originating from the cutting of KV6 directly above. The upper layer of this filling consisted of chips cemented together by water; underneath, the chips were dry and clean.

=== Doorway and blocking ===
When it was discovered, the tomb's outer door was blocked by two consecutive walls. The primary blocking consisted of a wall of cemented limestone blocks, plastered and stamped with the seal of the Royal Necropolis (with the jackal and nine captives motif). Weigall later stated that a fragment of Tutankhamun's seal had been recovered from this original blocking. However, his statement is not corroborated by any of the other reports dating from the initial discovery, leaving Weigall's claim open to question.

The first wall had been partially pulled down in antiquity, and the tomb was closed again by a second wall made of loose limestone fragments, erected in front of the remains of the first wall. Because Weigall described these consecutive blockings in ambiguous terms, it is unclear whether the secondary wall was found intact or had already been partially dismantled, like the primary wall.

=== Corridor ===
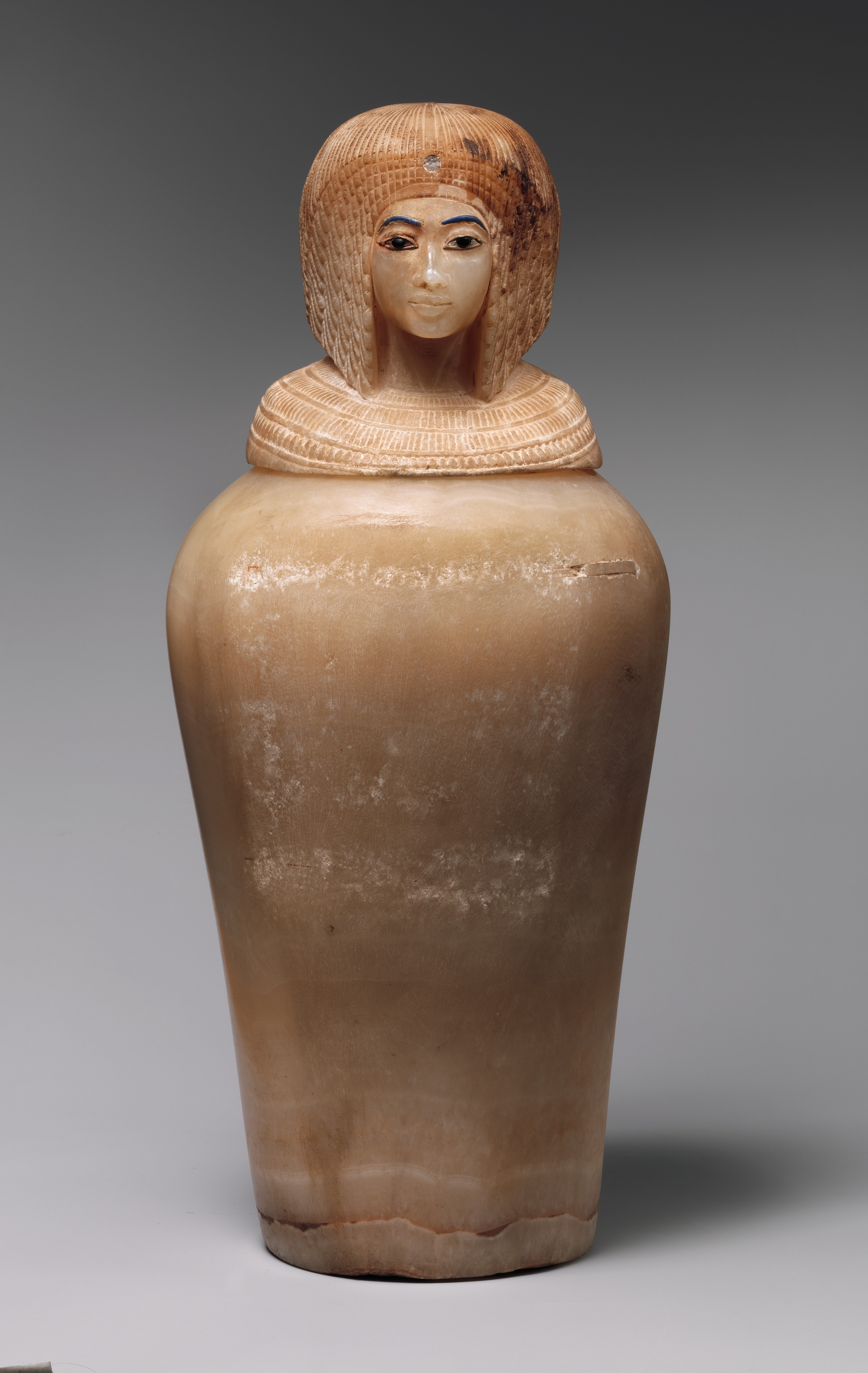
One of the four Egyptian alabaster canopic jars found in KV55, depicting what is thought to be the likeness of Queen Kiya

The sloping corridor beyond the entrance was partially filled with rubble. Since the secondary wall was built on top of material originating from this rubble, the fill seems to date from the time of the original interment. By 1907 this rubble had spread down into the burial chamber. Stains on the ceiling and walls of the corridor indicate that water had infiltrated the tomb in the past.

On top of the rubble fill were found a panel and door of a large gilded shrine, although the exact position of these items is unclear. Additional pieces of the same shrine were recovered from the burial chamber.

The other three of the four Egyptian alabaster canopic jars found in KV55, now in the Egyptian Museum.

=== Burial chamber and niche ===
The walls of the burial chamber were plastered, but otherwise undecorated. This plastering seems to have been done some years after the cutting of the tomb, and repairs are evident. Rubble fill from the corridor had spread down into the chamber, partially covering its floor with debris. Elsewhere in the burial chamber, the floor and numerous objects were covered with fragments of plaster fallen from the walls and stones fallen from the ceiling.

Items found in the burial chamber can be grouped into several categories:

- Parts of a dismantled, gilded shrine: Related to the panel and door found in the corridor. A door was found lying on the rubble inflow near the entrance to the chamber; large panels were lying on the floor or stacked against the eastern wall; and smaller elements (such as doorjambs, a lintel and possibly parts of the cornice) were lying on the floor.
- Coffin, mummy and related items: Lying against the southern wall and resting on the decayed remains of a lion-headed bier was a badly damaged coffin. Its lid was ajar, and the coffin box had rotted. The mummy contained in this coffin was badly preserved but its linen wrappings appear to have been intact. The damaged skull had been separated from the body and was found with a vulture pectoral wrapped around it. The left arm of the body was crossed over the chest, the right arm extended. In the niche above this coffin was found a set of four canopic jars. The jars show signs of erasure on where the text would have been. Also related to this group of items were four "magical bricks".
- Remains of boxes and their contents: At least two badly preserved boxes were found in the southeastern corner of the room, their contents spread on the floor. These included faience objects and appear to have been related to the "Opening of the Mouth" ceremony.
- Seal impressions: Several small seal impressions were found underneath the panels of the gilded shrine. These carry Tutankhamun's prenomen and are identical to seal type N found in Tutankhamun's own tomb.
- Other items: Their exact location in the chamber is not always clear. Included are a vase stand, a fragment of furniture, a silver head of a goose, pall-discs of gilded copper and a statue plinth.

Some wooden objects in the burial chamber seem to have suffered water damage, most notably the coffin, bier and boxes; however, the elements of the gilded shrine appear to have been reasonably solid. Moisture is also the likely cause of the discoloration visible on some of the faience objects, although other, similar objects appear unaffected.

== Interpretation ==
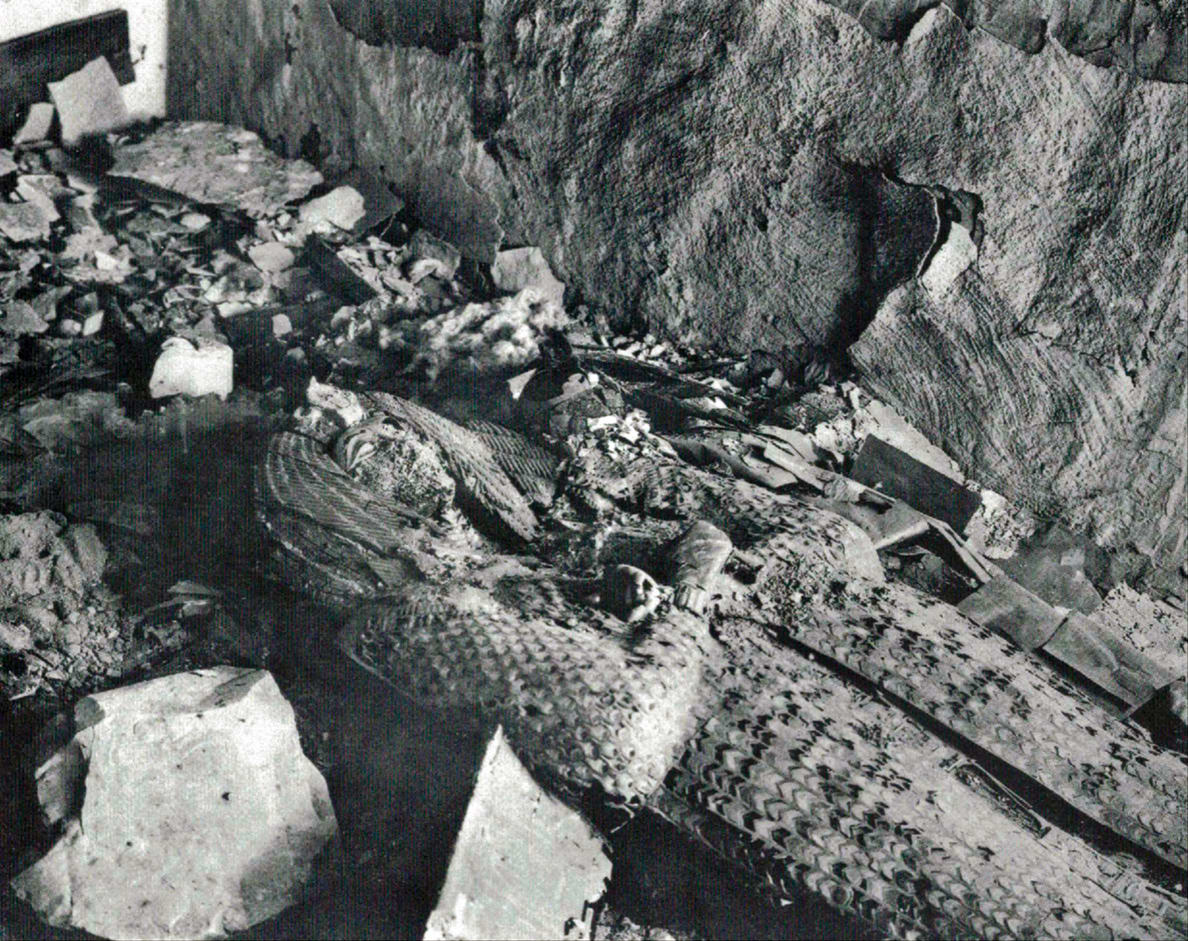
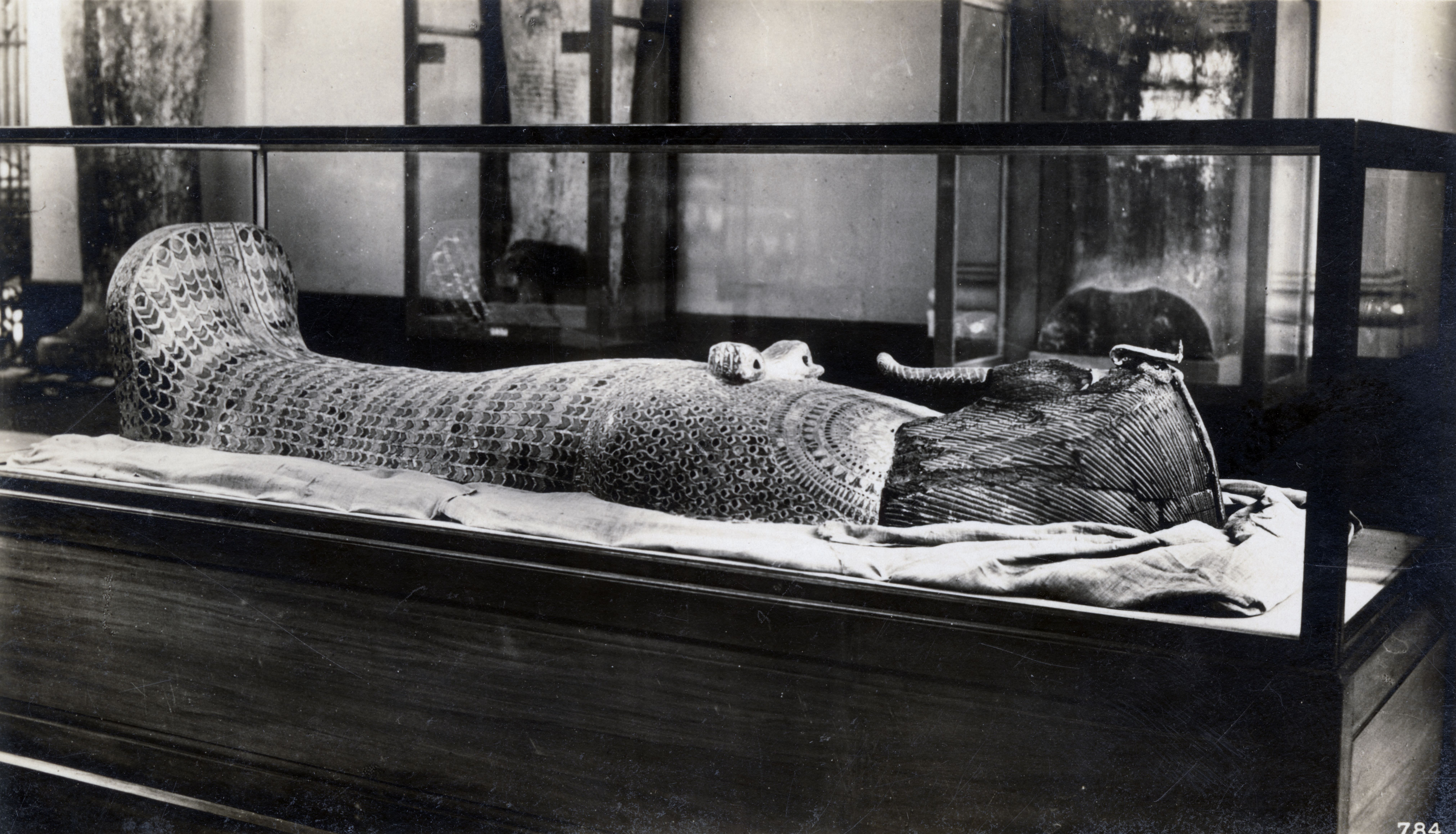
The royal coffin found in Tomb KV55 as found in-situ (left), and after being transported to the Cairo Museum (right)

The problems surrounding the interpretation of KV55 are due in large part to the shortcomings of Davis's original publication of the excavation. Its mix of fact, assumption, error and omission has obscured a full understanding of the deposit. The blame for these shortcomings usually falls on Davis (as editor of the publication) and Ayrton (as supervising archaeologist). Recent careful re-examinations of the original publication, of eyewitness reports, and of the photographs taken before the tomb was cleared have brought some clarity to the situation.

Although the tomb was clearly disturbed in antiquity and its contents have been described as disordered and chaotic, Martha Bell argued that this disarray was more apparent than real. Her reconstruction of the layout of the tomb indicates an orderly and deliberate arrangement of artefacts, and she suggests that the impression of chaos might be due to the collapse of wooden objects caused by falling plaster and stone. The "cemented" chips and stains in the corridor indicate that water entered the tomb along the corridor ceiling, but the amount of water might not have been great, and most damage could have been caused by increased humidity rather than direct contact with water. Bell also suggested that the moisture under the mummy might have resulted from rainfall shortly after the tomb's opening in 1907. Other damage to wooden objects might result from insects.

=== The shrine and Tiye's burial ===
A recent reconstruction of the shrine, based on photographic evidence, drawings, eyewitness descriptions and two surviving planks on display in Cairo, indicate that it resembled Tutankhamun's second and third shrines in general appearance and size. The presence of copper rosettes indicate that a funeral pall was draped on a frame associated with the shrine, also comparable to Tutankhamun's shrines. However, the decoration and inscriptions on the shrine are markedly different from those of Tutankhamun: the decoration was dominated by large offering scenes rather than a multitude of smaller mythological scenes; the text was far more brief, and seems primarily concerned with titles, names and the shrine's dedication, rather than with excerpts from funerary books; and the interior of the shrine was uninscribed and undecorated.

The text on the shrine states that it was made by Akhenaten for his mother Tiye. With one exception, the names of Akhenaten were erased and in some places were replaced by those of Amenhotep III (the father of Akhenaten) in ink. The text also refers to the "House of the Aten in Akhetaten", perhaps indicating that the shrine was made and originally used in Amarna. The decoration, which appears to have been very similar on all sides of the shrine, features Akhenaten and Tiye making offerings to the Aten, with a focus on the king rather than his mother. As with his names, Akhenaten's figure was erased from the scenes, with one exception.

The orderly arrangement of the shrine parts inside the tomb seems to indicate that it once stood up, fully assembled, with its doors facing south, and that it was later dismantled inside the tomb. It appears that only a single shrine was used in KV55, rather than a suite of four nested shrines, as in the tomb of Tutankhamun.

The presence of a shrine dedicated to Tiye is usually seen as evidence that Tiye's mummy once reposed inside the shrine in KV55. Other objects inscribed with her name (such as the piece of furniture) and with those of Amenhotep III are also seen as belonging to her funerary equipment. The seal impressions found near the east wall might indicate further items that were removed together with the queen's mummy at some later point.

=== Coffin, canopic jars and magical bricks ===
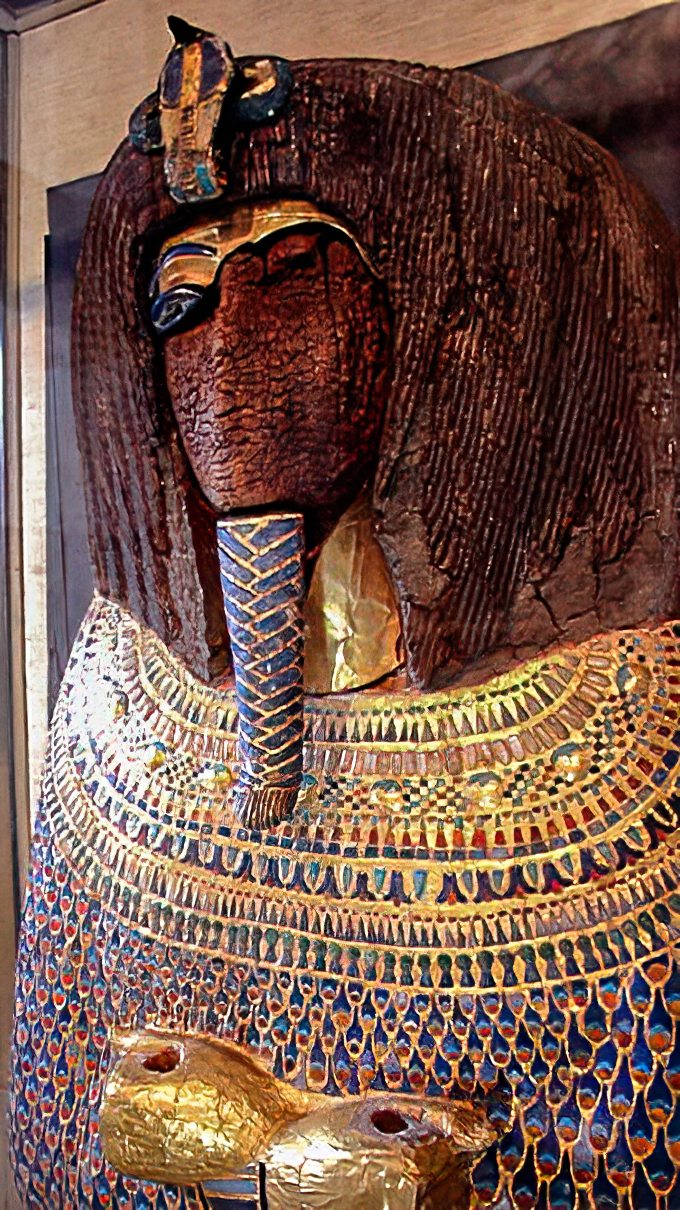
The desecrated royal coffin found in Tomb KV55

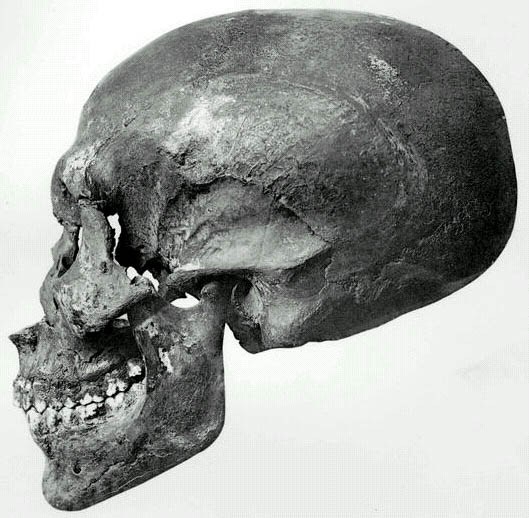
The profile view of the skull recovered from KV55

When KV55 was initially opened, Theodore Davis believed that he had found the tomb of Queen Tiye. However, it was quickly recognized that the human remains interred there were male. Georges Daressy further deduced that the gilded coffin found in the tomb was originally made for a woman and only later adapted to accommodate a king, through alterations to its inscriptions and the addition of a false beard, a uraeus and the royal scepters (crook and flail). The identity of the coffin's original owner has been a matter of much discussion over the years, with Tiye, Nefertiti, Meketaten and Meritaten all proposed as candidates. It is now widely accepted that the coffin was originally intended for Akhenaten's secondary wife Kiya. It is also recognized that the four canopic jars discovered near the coffin belonged to Kiya, and that the female heads on the stoppers of the jars portray her. Like the coffin, the canopic jars were altered for the burial of a king through the erasure of Kiya's titulary and the addition of a royal uraeus to each portrait head.

All personal names inscribed on the coffin and the canopic jars were excised in antiquity, rendering the identity of the human remains inside the coffin a matter of long debate. Over the past century, the chief candidates for this individual have been either Akhenaten or Smenkhkare, another male member of the Amarna royal family.

Evidence that the occupant of the coffin was Akhenaten is provided by the four magical bricks found inside the tomb. Two were inscribed in hieratic, but they are poorly preserved and the name of their owner is lost. The other two, however, are of better quality, with hieroglyphic inscriptions naming the Osiris Neferkheprure Waenre, a reference to Akhenaten's nomen. The fact that all four bricks were oriented correctly and that three of them were positioned in close association with the coffin suggests that they were intended as a set and were made for the coffin's final occupant, who therefore, would be Akhenaten.

=== The identification of the mummy ===
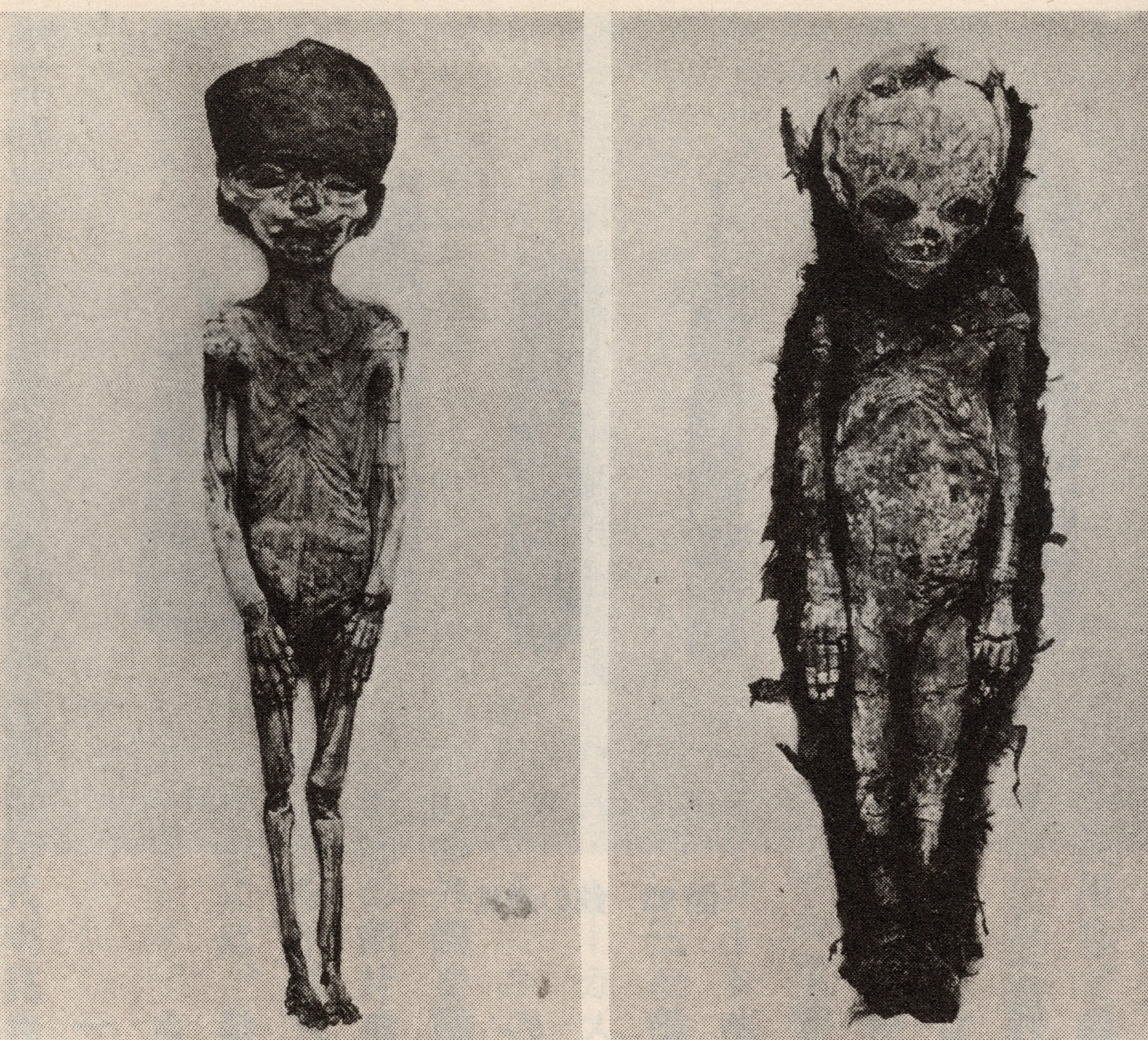
The two daughters of Tutankhamun, and - according to DNA results of Hawass's team - paternal granddaughters of KV55. As father of their presumed mother, Ankhesenamun, Akhenaten should also be their maternal grandfather; however data shows KV55 male cannot be the princesses's grandfather from their mother's side.

The mummy found in the tomb was, however, at first identified as belonging to a woman by two visiting physicians who examined the remains in situ. This led Davis to conclude he had found the mummy of queen Tiye and he therefore published his account of the discovery as The Tomb of Queen Tiyi. As possible reasons for this initial identification the (typical female) position of the mummy's arms, post-mortem damage to the pelvic bones and the absence of male genitalia have been suggested. But when anatomist Grafton Elliot Smith examined the skull and bones in Cairo a few months later he concluded that they were those of a young male, with wide hips, a pendent chin, and distorted cranium brought on by chronic hydrocephalus. The age of death he estimated as being around 25 years although he later suggested the possibility that the body had suffered from Frölich's syndrome which delayed normal skeletal maturation. These results were seen to support the initial claims by Weigall, Maspero and Smith, based on other evidence found in the tomb (see above) that the body was that of Akhenaten.

Later re-examinations of the remains confirmed Smith's original identification of the mummy as belonging to a young male (although with feminine traits) but pushed the estimated age of death back to around 20 years. These re-examinations also indicated that the body showed no signs of delayed maturation, and that, while the skull was of unusual shape, it was not abnormal, and showed no indication of hydrocephalus. Reconstruction of the facial features of the skull also indicated that the mummy's face in life bore no particular resemblance to Akhenaten's representation on his monuments. However, as Akhenaten's depictions were highly stylised, the lack of similarity is not conclusive. After the discovery of the tomb of Tutankhamun, a close resemblance was noted between his mummy and the body found in KV55 and later tests showed both shared the same blood-group (A2) and serum antigen (MN), all of which suggests Tutankhamun and the individual found in KV55 were closely related to each other, either as father and son, or brothers. Based on these results it was concluded that the KV55 body was too young to be Akhenaten and they were seen to support the claim that the mummy was that of Smenkhkare, an idea first proposed by Rex Engelbach in 1931.

Before February 2010, it was pointed out that the reliability of methods to assess the age of death for mummies in general was uncertain. For these reasons the correctness of the age estimates was repeatedly called into question. Several studies estimated the mummy to be of a man who died around age 25–26; beside Smith, Douglas E. Derry and Ronald G. Harrison came to this conclusion. John R. Harris in the late 1980s offered 35 years as its age, while Joyce Filer in the early 2000s suggested early 20s. Elsewhere, an analysis of the skeletal remains based on dentition and X-rays of the long bones indicated 35 years. Finally, examinations using CT scans from the late 2000s, published in 2010 and 2016, showed the mummy to have died between age 35–45, which the examiners believe supports the theory that the mummy is Akhenaten's. The archaeological, inscriptional, and now genetic evidence indicate that the ancient Egyptians who buried (and later desecrated) the body in KV55 believed this to be Akhenaten's. However, a number of experts dispute these findings, claiming that Hawass et al. have not provided sufficient evidence to assume the older age at death. In fact, the original 2010 paper only cites a single point of spinal degeneration, while other analyses, such as Strouhal's cite multiple indicators for a younger age.

Moreover, according to the genetic research KV55 cannot be maternal grandfather of the two daughters of Tutankhamun, who are believed to be children of Akhenaten's daughter, Queen Ankhesenamun. Juan Belmonte argues that the most likely solution to this problem is that KV55 body belongs to Smenkhkare, not Akhenaten. However, he acknowledges that there are also possibilities that Tutankhamun fathered his children by different consort(s) than Ankhesenamun, or that KV55 is indeed Akhenaten but he was not biological father of Ankhesenamun because of Nefertiti's extramarital affair.

In March 2021, the results of a new forensic facial reconstruction were released.

=== Reconstruction ===
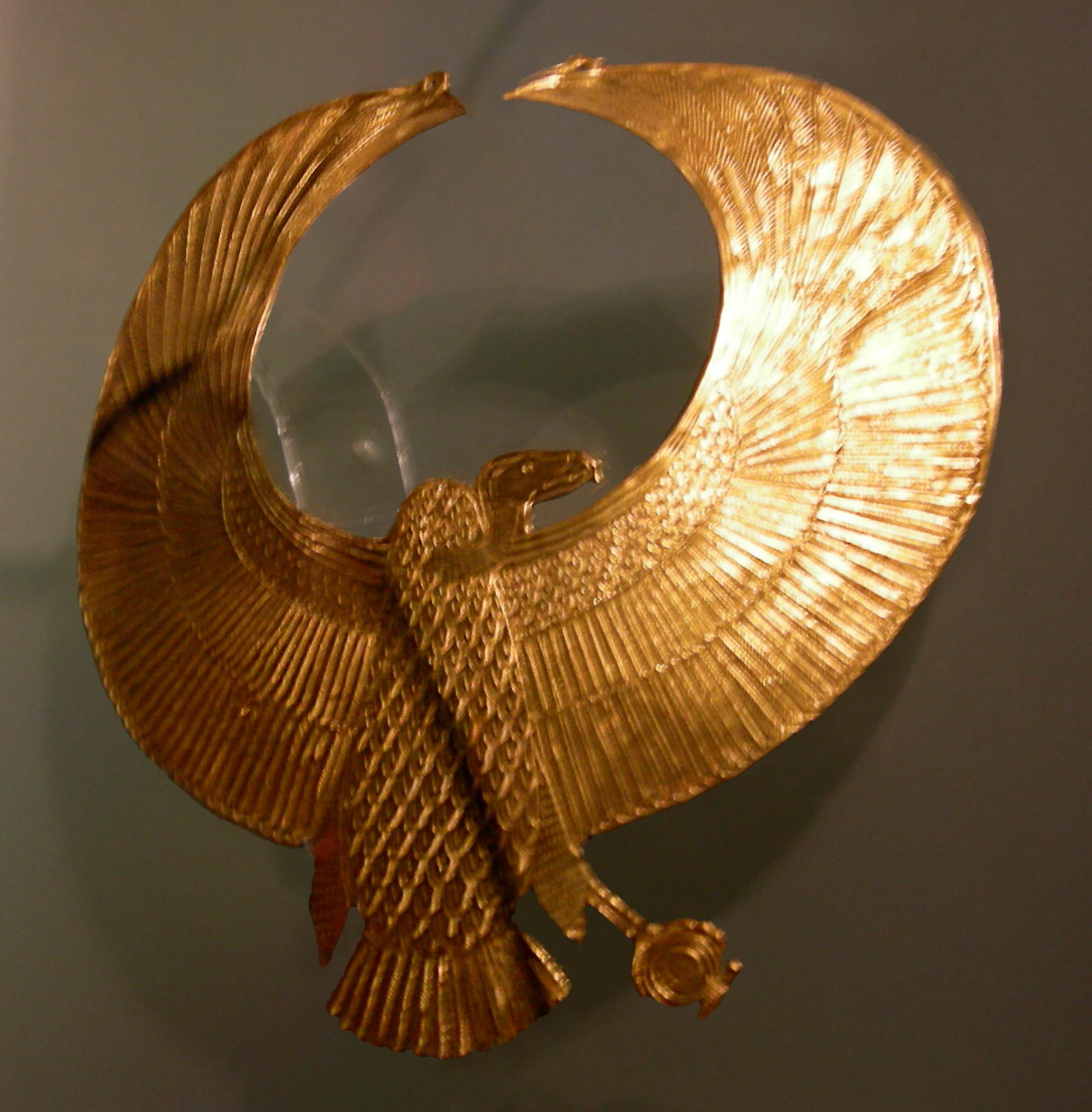
The Ancient Egyptian vulture pectoral found on the head of the mysterious king in tomb KV55

The deposit, as it was found in KV55, presents a mixture of chronological and religious anomalies. Objects inscribed with Amenhotep III's nomen and prenomen might be contemporary with that king's reign and could be interpreted as possessions of Queen Tiye. Other items inscribed with Tiye's name (such as the shrine and furniture elements) also clearly belonged to her. Akhenaten's presence is indicated by items originally inscribed for him (such as the magical bricks) and items that were adapted for his use (such as the coffin and canopic jars).

It is nevertheless highly unlikely that either of these two burials within KV55 was original. In the case of Tiye, evidence found in tomb WV22 suggests that Amenhotep III prepared her burial in his own tomb. However, the fact that Tiye outlived her husband by possibly as much as twelve years seems to have disrupted such plans. On the other hand, from inscriptional evidence on the KV55 shrine, it seems likely that Tiye was buried at Amarna by her son Akhenaten. In the case of Akhenaten, it seems almost certain that he was originally buried in the tomb he prepared for himself in the Amarna royal wadi. Although it is unclear whether or not the original blocking of the tomb was stamped with Tutankhamun's seal, the several small seal-impressions carrying his prenomen are most likely related to the reburial(s) in KV55, since he was probably not involved in the original burial preparations of either Tiye (who died several years before Tutankhamun came to the throne) or Akhenaten (who, presumably, was buried by his co-regent and probable immediate successor, Smenkhkare).

One scenario, as suggested by Nicholas Reeves, is as follows: Akhenaten and his mother, Queen Tiye, were originally entombed in the Royal Tomb at Akhenaten's new capital Akhetaten (modern Amarna), but their mummies were moved to KV55 following the total abandonment of Akhetaten during the reign of Tutankhamun, who was Akhenaten's son. The door to KV55 was sealed with Tutankhamun's name. There, the mummies remained for about 200 years, until the tomb was rediscovered by workmen excavating the tomb of Ramesses IX (KV6) nearby. By this time, Akhenaten was reviled as the "heretic king" and "the enemy of Akhetaten"; consequently, Queen Tiye's sarcophagus was hastily removed from his defiling presence, except for its surrounding gilded wooden shrine, which would have had to be dismantled for removal. Akhenaten's likeness was chiseled off the shrine's carved relief. Moreover, the gold face mask was ripped from Akhenaten's sarcophagus and his identifying cartouche was removed from its hieroglyphic inscription, thus consigning its occupant to oblivion. As a final insult, a large rock was thrown at the coffin. However, a finely made vulture pectoral—a symbol of royalty in Ancient Egypt—was still found placed around this mummy's head.

== Later use of KV55 ==
In 1923, Harry Burton used KV55 as a darkroom to develop his photographs documenting Howard Carter's excavation of Tutankhamun's tomb.

== In literature ==
The discovery and opening of KV55 is one of the events recounted in the novel The Ape Who Guards the Balance by the Egyptologist Barbara Mertz (writing as Elizabeth Peters).

== See also ==
- Royal Tomb of Akhenaten
