= Theodore M. Davis =

American lawyer and businessman

Theodore M. Davis (May 7, 1838 – February 23, 1915) was an American lawyer and businessman. He is best known for his excavations in Egypt's Valley of the Kings between 1902 and 1913.

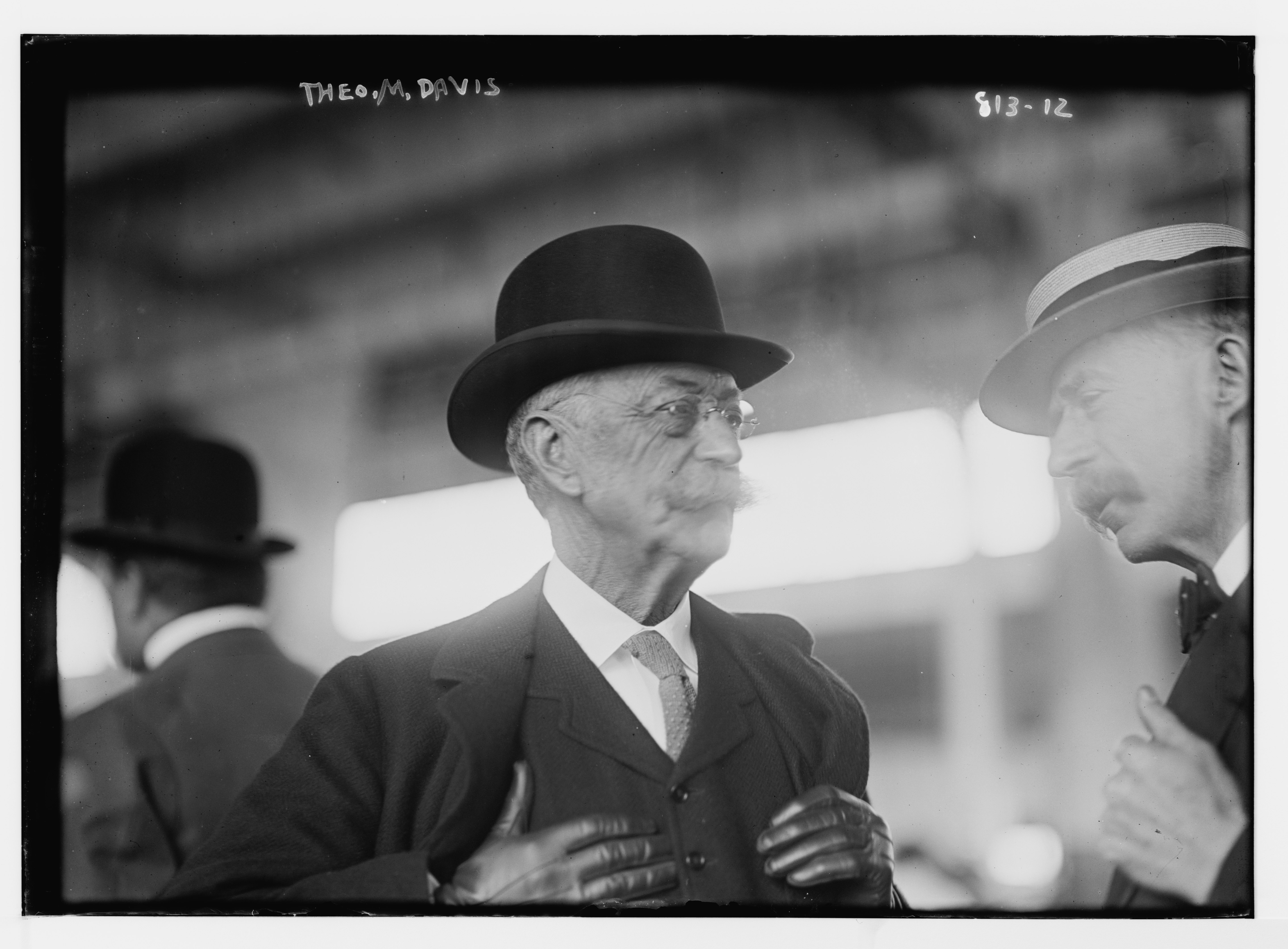

== Biography ==
Theodore Montgomery Davis was born in Springfield, New York on May 7, 1838. He settled in Iowa City, where he qualified as a lawyer, later moving to Washington DC, then to New York City. After becoming wealthy in a career in the law and business, he moved to Newport, Rhode Island in 1882 where he built a mansion known as "The Reef" (later "The Bells") on Ocean Avenue, on property which is now Brenton Point State Park. The building was demolished in 1963 due to a fire from 1961.

Although married, Davis had a live-in mistress, Emma Andrews, from 1887 until his death. Andrews was the cousin of his wife Annie Buttles Davis. He spent his winters in Europe and on digs in Egypt (from 1900). In the winter of 1915 he did not go to Egypt for health reasons and instead rented the Florida home of William Jennings Bryan, then Secretary of State. He died there on February 23, 1915 aged 76, leaving the Davis Madonna and his private collection of Egyptian artifacts to the Metropolitan Museum of Art. Even though he left his collection to the Museum, his nephew, Theodore Davis "Terry" Boal, with Annie's support, began contesting Davis's will. It was finally resolved around 15 years later.

== Excavations ==
Starting in 1902, Davis acted as private sponsor for the Egyptian Antiquities Service's excavations in the Valley of the Kings. Due to the success of this first season, which included the discovery of KV45 (tomb of Userhet) and a box containing leather loincloths from above KV36 (tomb of Maiherpri), this sponsorship was renewed each year until 1905. During this period excavations were conducted in his name by the inspector-general of antiquities for Upper Egypt (Howard Carter from 1902 to 1904, and James E. Quibell for the 1904-1905 season).

In 1905 Arthur Weigall, as new inspector-general, persuaded Davis to sign a new concession for work in the Valley of the Kings and to employ his own archaeologist. Under these new conditions excavations were conducted by Edward R. Ayrton (1905-1908), E. Harold Jones (1908-1911) and Harry Burton (1912–1914). By 1913, Davis was convinced that either KV54, the Tutankhamun embalming cache, or KV57, Horemheb's tomb, were in fact the tomb of King Tutankhamun. In the 1912 site report, The Tombs of Harmhabi and Touatânkhamanou, which was about the finds from the 1908 season, he stated “I fear the Valley of the Tombs is now exhausted.” The concession then passed on to Lord Carnarvon. Although excavation commenced during the 1914–1915 season, the concession was not formally signed until 1915.

The excavations carried out under Davis's sponsorship are among the most important ever undertaken in the Valley of the Kings: in the course of 12 years about 30 tombs were discovered and/or cleared in his name, the best known among them are KV46 (tomb of Yuya and Tjuyu), KV55 (the Amarna cache), KV57 (tomb of Horemheb) and KV54 (Tutankhamun embalming cache). Most of the objects discovered went to Cairo Museum, where they were displayed in a gallery named ‘Salle Theodore Davis’, with further items presented to the Metropolitan Museum of Art and other American museums. He also published seven volumes laying out his finds.

With Carter's discovery of KV62, Tutankhamun's tomb, in 1922, Davis's opinion that the "valley had been exhausted" was proved wrong. Burton later recalled that when Davis terminated his last excavation in the valley, out of fear of undercutting nearby tombs and pathways, he was only two metres away from discovering the entrance to KV62.

In Luxor, fellow Rhode Islander Charles Wilbour introduced Davis to antiquities dealer Muhammad Mohassib on their first trip up the Nile in 1890. Wilbour had bought from Mohassib for years, and he became a trusted dealer for Davis. Many people bought a number of important pieces from him over the years.

=== List of discoveries and excavations ===
The KV designation indicates a tomb in the Valley of the Kings.

- 1902: KV45
- 1903: KV20, KV43, KV60
- 1905: KV2, KV19, KV22, KV46, KV47, KV53
- 1906: KV48, KV49, KV50, KV51, KV52
- 1907: KV10, KV54, KV55
- 1908: KV56, KV57
- 1909: KV58
- 1910: KV61
- 1912: KV3
- 1913: KV7

== In popular culture ==
Davis was portrayed by William Hope in the 2005 BBC docudrama Egypt.

Davis was portrayed by Anthony Higgins in the 2016 miniseries Tutankhamun.

Davis and the tomb of Queen Tiyi also feature prominently in The Ape Who Guards the Balance by Elizabeth Peters, where he is portrayed as a clumsy dilettante more interested in discovering tombs than excavating them and protecting the contents.

== Bibliography ==
- The Tomb of Thoutmosis IV (1904)
- The Tomb of Hatshopsitu (1906)
- The Tomb of Iouiya and Touiyou: Notes on Iouiya and Touiyou, description of the objects found in the tomb, and illustrations of the objects (1907)
- The Tomb of Siphtah (1908)
- The Tomb of Queen Tîyi (1910)
- The Tombs of Harmhabi and Touatankhamanou (1912)
