= Edward R. Ayrton =

English egyptologist and archaeologist (1882–1914)

Edward Russell Ayrton (17 December 1882 – 18 May 1914) was an English Egyptologist and archaeologist.

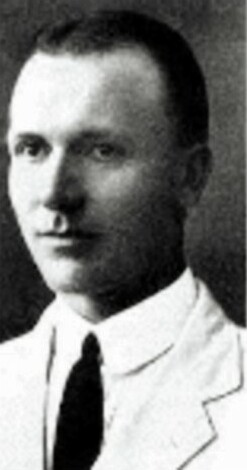
Edward Russell Ayrton

== Early life ==
Ayrton was the son of William Scrope Ayrton (1849-1904), a British consular official in China, and his wife Ellen Louisa McClatchie, and was born in Wuhu, China, on 17 December 1882 (coincidentally, the same year as the formation of the Egypt Exploration Fund). His younger sister was the suffragist Phyllis Ayrton (1884-1975).

The Ayrton family originated in Yorkshire. Edward's similarly-named forebear, Edward Ayrton (1698-1774), was mayor of Ripon in 1760, laying the foundations for the family's subsequent prominence. The mayor's son was the leading organist and choirmaster, Dr. Edmund Ayrton (1734-1808) and his son in turn - the mayor's grandson and the great-grandfather of the archeologist - was the theatre-reviewer William Ayrton (1777-1858).

Ayrton was educated at St Paul's School, in London.

== Career ==
He began his career in Egyptology at the age of 20, assisting the pioneer of systematic methodology in archaeology William Matthew Flinders Petrie. He joined Petrie on the Egypt Exploration Fund excavations at Abydos (which began in 1899) from 1902 to 1904.

Ayrton's first independent work was the excavation of the Second Dynasty site of Shunet ez Zebib (at Abydos). Later, he worked near Ghurab with William Leonard Stevenson Loat.

In 1904–05, he excavated and recorded graves of several ancient princesses found in the funerary temple complex of king Mentuhotep II at Deir al-Bahari, as part of the expedition led by Édouard Naville and Henry Hall.

Working for Theodore M. Davis in Egypt's Valley of the Kings from 1905 to 1908, he discovered the following tombs:

- KV47 (of the pharaoh Siptah, in 1905)
- KV55 (Amarna Period, interment problematic, in 1907)
- KV56 (of a royal child, in 1908) and
- KV57 (of the pharaoh Horemheb, in 1908).

He also led or participated in the excavation of the following tombs:

- KV2, KV10, KV46, KV47, KV48, KV49, KV50, KV51, KV52, KV53, KV54, KV56, KV57, KV59, and KV60.

Again working with Loat, in 1908-09 he excavated amongst the Sixth Dynasty tombs at Abydos and also the Predynastic cemetery at El Mahasna.

In 1911, he accepted a position with the Archaeological Survey of Ceylon. On the 18 May 1914 he drowned while on a shooting expedition, in an accident on the Tissa Tank lake, Tissamaharama, in southern Ceylon (now Sri Lanka).

The Times printed his obituary on the 23 May 1914; and his Probate Administration was published in 1915. The Estate of £457 18s 1d was left to his elder sister, Florence Margaret Ayrton.

== Bibliography ==
- E. R. Ayrton, "Discovery of the tomb of Si-ptah in the Bibân el Molûk, Thebes", PSBA, 28, 1906.
- Edward R. Ayrton and W. L. S. Loat, "Pre-dynastic cemetery at El Mahasna", 1911, London.
- Edward R. Ayrton, "The Date of Buddhadasa of Ceylon from a Chinese Source". Journal of the Royal Asiatic Society of Great Britain and Ireland, 1911.
- Edward R. Ayrton, "The Excavation of the Tomb of Queen Tîyi", The Tomb of Queen Tîyi, ed. Nicholas Reeves, San Francisco, KMT Communications, 1990.
