= Minor tombs in the Valley of the Kings =

The majority of the 65 numbered tombs in the Valley of the Kings can be considered minor tombs, either because at present they have yielded little information or because the results of their investigation was only poorly recorded by their explorers, while some have received very little attention or were only cursorily noted. Most of these tombs are small, often only consisting of a single burial chamber accessed by means of a shaft or a staircase with a corridor or a series of corridors leading to the chamber, but some are larger, multiple chambered tombs. These minor tombs served various purposes, some were intended for burials of lesser royalty or for private burials, some contained animal burials and others apparently never received a primary burial. In many cases these tombs also served secondary functions and later intrusive material has been found related to these secondary activities. While some of these tombs have been open since antiquity, the majority were discovered in the 19th and early 20th centuries during the height of exploration in the valley.

== Designation ==
Tombs in the Valley of the Kings are assigned a numerical KV (for Kings' Valley) or WV (for West Valley) designation in the order of their discovery. Besides these numbered tombs, there is also a series of pits and possible tomb commencements, ordered in an alphabetical sequence from WVA (actually a small tomb) to KVT, although the exact number of these pits, and in many cases their location, is not known. The assignment of this alphabetical sequence has been done by more recent researchers, often on the basis of cursory references in older reports or field notes.

== List of minor tombs ==
=== Tombs in the East Valley ===
==== KV3 ====
KV3 is located in a side wadi of the main valley, adjacent to KV46 and KV4. Although it has been open since antiquity and had been visited by several explorers earlier on, the tomb was first excavated by Harry Burton in 1912. Before him both Edward R. Ayrton and James E. Quibell excavated in the vicinity of the tomb's entrance during 1904–1906. The work of these three men in and around the tomb was conducted for Theodore M. Davis.

The layout of KV3 resembles that of other Twentieth Dynasty tombs intended for members of the royal family in the Valley of the Queens. It consists of a corridor with two side chambers (one of which is unfinished) leading into a pillared chamber, again with partially finished side chambers, which in its turn gives access to three consecutive smaller rooms the first two of which have vaulted ceilings. The tomb has decoration in its corridor, depicting Ramesses III followed by a prince, while Carl Richard Lepsius, who visited the tomb in the mid-19th century, also mentions decoration elsewhere in the tomb which is now lost. It has been suggested that KV3 is the tomb mentioned on an ostracon dating from year 28 of Ramesses III, a tomb which was to be quarried in the valley for one of Ramesses's sons. The identity of the intended princely occupant of this tomb remains unknown but it has been suggested that this might have been the later Ramesses IV.

Burton's clearance of the tomb yielded no material of New Kingdom date and therefore it has been supposed that the tomb was never used for a burial. Later intrusive material from Byzantine times suggest the tomb was adapted as a Christian chapel by Copts.

==== KV12 ====
KV12 is located in the main valley and has been open since antiquity. It was cleared by Ernest Harold Jones in 1908–09 for Davis, while in 1920–21 Howard Carter unsuccessfully searched in the vicinity of the tombs entrance for foundation deposits.

The tomb has an unusual plan, with a staircase which leads directly into a room with one pillar from which a series of corridors lead down into multiple chambers. Markings for uncut doorways indicate that the tombs layout is unfinished. Differences in the quality of the quarrying and architectural style suggest the tomb was constructed over a period of time, starting in the Eighteenth Dynasty, continuing into the Nineteenth Dynasty, and possibly continuing afterwards. The tomb in its present layout was definitely in existence by the time of the construction of KV9 (tomb of Ramesses V and Ramesses VI) since the quarrying of that tomb collided with the rearmost chamber of KV12.

Other than shabtis belonging to Ramesses VI that were discovered at the entrance of the tomb, no datable material has been found and nothing is known of its intended occupant or occupants. However, it seems likely that the tomb was used during the Nineteenth Dynasty, and possibly the early Twentieth Dynasty, for multiple burials of lesser royalty (like KV5). These burials might have been disturbed by workmen quarrying KV9 and the tomb was likely further despoiled at the same time KV9 was broken into. The presence of Ramesses VI's shabtis near the entrance of KV12 might indicate that robbers gained access to both tombs via KV12.

==== KV13 ====
KV13 is located near KV14 (tomb of Twosret and Setnakhte). It has been partially open since antiquity but was only recently cleared by Hartwig Altenmüller. The tomb is unfinished and is formed by three sloping corridors, followed by two rooms and two further corridors leading to the burial chamber. The architecture of the tomb closely resembles that of KV14. A slight change in axis in the lower part of the tomb has been taken as evidence that the last corridor and burial chamber are later additions. The tomb has suffered severe flood damage and its ceilings have collapsed and most of the decoration is now lost.

Other than two anthropoid sarcophagi, found in the last corridor and the burial chamber, KV13 has yielded little remains. Its original quarrying has been attributed to Bay, a royal scribe under Seti II and later chancellor under Siptah, but it remains doubtful that he was ever buried here. The two sarcophagi are of a later, Twentieth Dynasty date. The tombs belong to Ramesses Mentuherkhepshef, a son of Ramesses IX, and Amenherkhepshef, probably a son of Ramesses III. The sarcophagus of the latter was usurped from its original owner Twosret.

==== KV19 ====
KV19 is located in one of the valley's side wadis, near KV20 and KV60. It was discovered by Giovanni Battista Belzoni in 1817. It was later excavated by James Burton (1825), Carter (1903) and Ayrton (1905–06), the later two working for Davis.

The tomb is unfinished and consists only of an open entryway, a first corridor and the beginning of a second corridor. A pit quarried just inside the second corridor might have functioned as a place of interment. The first corridor has decoration and texts indicating the occupant was a prince.

It seems likely that KV19 was originally intended for the burial of prince Ramesses Setherkhepeshef but its construction was abandoned when he ascended the throne as Ramesses VIII. The tomb was later taken over for the burial of prince Ramesses Mentuherkhepshef but his remains have not been found, neither in KV19 nor in either of the two royal caches. His sarcophagus was found in KV13 (see above). When the tomb was discovered, Belzoni found an unspecified number of intrusive burials, probably dating from the Twenty-second Dynasty.

==== KV26 ====
KV26 is located in the wadi that leads towards KV34 (tomb of Thutmose III), it was first noticed by James Burton in 1825. It is a small tomb, consisting of a short, level corridor and a single room accessed via a shaft. This tomb was never excavated and is partially covered in debris. Nothing is known regarding possible burial(s) or owner(s). Similarities in layout suggest it is of Eighteenth Dynasty date.

==== KV27 ====
KV27 is located in a side wadi, close to KV21 and KV28. It might have been known to both Belzoni and John Gardner Wilkinson but the only documented clearance is a partial excavation by Ryan in 1990. The tomb consists of a chamber, accessed by a shaft and with three side rooms. Although the remains of several mummies has been noted nothing is known about its possible owner(s). Ceramics datable to the reigns of Thutmose IV or Amenhotep III, the proximity of other tombs of the same period and architectural typology indicate a date in the Eighteenth Dynasty.

==== KV28 ====
KV28 is located only a few meters away from KV27. Like that tomb it was known to Wilkinson but has only been recently cleared by Ryan. The tomb consists of a single chamber accessed by a shaft, but the presence of an unexcavated doorway in the chambers back wall might lead to further rooms beyond. There is evidence for at least two burials in the tomb and besides human remains other finds include mummy trappings and pottery datable to the reign of Thutmose IV, which suggest an Eighteenth Dynasty date. Nothing is known of the tomb's intended owners.

==== KV29 ====
KV29 is located in the south-west wadi of the valley. It was first noted by James Burton. This tomb has never been excavated and remains inaccessible, it is possible that it consist only of a shaft. Nothing is known of its owner (if it was ever used), its content (if any), or the date of its construction.

==== KV30 ====
KV30 is located in the wadi leading towards KV34. It was discovered and excavated by Belzoni in 1817 for the Second Earl Belmore and the tomb is therefore also known as Lord Belmore's Tomb. It consists of a level corridor, accessed by a shaft and leading towards a chamber with four side rooms. The only finds recorded for this tomb is a potsherd datable to the Eighteenth Dynasty. Nothing further is known about it.

==== KV31 ====
KV31 lies between KV30 and KV32. It was discovered and excavated by Belzoni in 1817. Only its entry shaft is known today. Nothing further is known about this tomb.

==== KV32 ====
KV32, like KV30 and KV31, is located in the wadi that leads up towards KV34. It was discovered and excavated by Victor Loret in 1898, in 2000-01 it was re-excavated by the Swiss MISR Project. The tomb consists of an unfinished chamber with a central pillar and small side room that is reached by a series of stairwells and corridors. The latter quarried tomb KV47 (tomb of Siptah accidentally collided with the small side room of KV32.

The recent clearance of the tomb yielded a canopic chest belonging to queen Tiaa, the wife of Amenhotep II and mother of Thutmose IV, allowing the identification of KV32's owner and dating the tomb to the reign of Amenhotep II in the Eighteenth Dynasty.

==== KV33 ====
KV33 is located directly besides KV34. It was discovered and examined by Loret in 1898. It consist of a flight of steps leading to two rooms, although no accurate plan exists. Nothing further is known about this tomb and it is presently inaccessible, but it seems likely that it dates from the Eighteenth Dynasty. It has been suggested that it was a subsidiary tomb to KV34, although it appears that the tomb was never used.

==== KV37 ====
KV37 is located in the wadi leading towards KV34, KV32 is located nearby. It was first noted by James Burton and (re)discovered and examined by Loret in 1899. It consists of a single chamber reached by a stair and a corridor. Nothing is known about the primary burial. The tomb is dated to the Eighteenth Dynasty. A diverse range of objects was found in the tomb, dating from the Eighteenth and Nineteenth dynasties and it has been suggested that KV37 was used as a robbers "workshop".

==== KV40 ====
KV40 is located in the same wadi as the previous tombs. It was discovered and examined by Loret in 1899 but no report was published at that time. It contains the remains of minor 18th Dynasty royals and was reused for a 22nd Dynasty burial.

==== KV41 ====
KV41 is located outside the main valley in what is called the Valley of the Pits behind Deir el-Bahari. It was discovered and examined by Loret in 1899 and was re-examined in 1991 by the Institut Français d'Archéologie Orientale. The tomb consists of just a shaft of over 10 meters deep.

No objects were recovered from this tomb, and it seems likely that it was never finished or used. Nevertheless, it has been suggested this was a tomb intended for Tetisheri, wife of Senakhtenre Tao I of the Seventeenth Dynasty. If so, this would be one of the earliest tombs in the valley.

==== KV44 ====
KV44 is situated in a side wadi, close to KV45. It was discovered and excavated by Carter in 1901 and has recently been re-examined by Ryan. It consists of a single chamber accessed by a shaft. When discovered the tomb was blocked and inside were discovered three mummies in wooden coffins, these belonged to Tentkerer, a lady of the house of Osorkon I, Heiufaa, and an unnamed songstress of Amun. These burials, belonging to the Twenty-second Dynasty, are evidently secondary burials since they were placed on rubbish filling about one fifth of the tomb. In this rubble the remains of seven earlier mummies were found, without coffins or funerary equipment. Several bee nests on the ceiling indicate that the tomb had lain open for some time in antiquity. The original cutting of the tomb is dated to the Eighteenth Dynasty. Nothing is known of the original occupants of KV44 but it has been suggested that this was a tomb for Anen.

==== KV45 ====
KV45 is located next to KV44 and like that tomb it consists of a single chamber accessed by a shaft. It was discovered and excavated by Carter in 1902, it was recently cleared by Ryan. Like KV44 it had been used for (two) secondary burials during the Twenty-second Dynasty. Fragments of the original burial, including canopic jars (but no human remains) indicate the original owner was Userhet, overseer of the fields of Amun during the Eighteenth Dynasty.

==== KV48 ====
KV48 is located in the wadi leading to KV35 (tomb of Amenhotep II). It was discovered and excavated by Ayrton in 1906. It is formed by a single chamber accessed by a shaft. When discovered the tomb was blocked by a rebuild stone wall, indicating the tomb was entered and resealed in antiquity. However, it is unclear whether this rebuild wall was itself breached at a later point or not.

The contents of the tomb were evidently severely ransacked in antiquity. Ayrton found an unwrapped mummy on the floor, its coffin was only represented by fragments scattered about on the floor. Fragments of the usual funerary equipment (including a wooden chair, magical bricks and shabtis) were also recovered. Most of this material lay on top of a layer of rubble. This equipment identifies the owner of the tomb as Amenemopet called Pairy, a noble from the time of Amenhotep II (whose tomb is nearby). The fact that his burial was placed on top of a layer of debris indicates the tomb had been in existence and had been open for a while, there is nevertheless nothing to indicate that this was not the primary burial in this tomb. Amenemopet also had another tomb (TT29) in the Theban Necropolis.

KV48 is at present inaccessible.

==== KV49 ====
KV49 is located in the wadi leading to KV35, close to KV48. Like that tomb it was discovered and excavated by Ayrton in 1906. The tomb is unfinished and is formed by a staircase and a descending corridor leading towards a room with a further (unfinished) stairwell in its floor. The doorway leading to the tomb's single chamber shows traces of being blocked by a plastered stone wall in antiquity, which might indicate it was used for a burial at some point. The cutting of the tomb itself is dated to the Eighteenth Dynasty, but the tomb appears to have been accessible and used later during the New Kingdom as is evident from its contents (consisting of an ostracon, mummy wrappings, shreds of cloth and gaming pieces) and from two graffiti on its entrance doorway.

These text and the material found in the tomb have been interpreted in various ways. Some see in it evidence for the provisioning of a burial in KV49, others suggest the tomb was used as a storage for rags used as candles while others still suggest this tomb was used to restore the royal mummies during the time when the valley was dismantled and its occupants reburied in the royal caches.

==== KV50, KV51 and KV52 ====
These three tombs are all located in the same general area as KV48 and KV49. They were discovered and excavated by Ayrton in 1906. All three are tombs with a single chamber accessed by a shaft and all three contained animal burials. These tombs had been robbed in antiquity, as is evident from the unwrapped state of the animals. The doorway to KV51 showed evidence of an original plaster and sealed blocking, but had been reblocked with loose stones and part of a coffin lid. Whereas KV51 was completely filled with animals, the other two tombs only contained a few mummies (two in KV50, one in KV52) and it is uncertain whether these two tombs had been intended to contain a human burial or not: KV50 contained fragmentary remains of a wooden coffin and KV52 an empty canopic chest.

KV51 contained material which was dated to the Eighteenth Dynasty, a dating which is ascribed to all three of these closely related tombs. It has also been suggested (although there is no real evidence to support this theory) that the animals interred here were a king's pets and that, given the proximity of his tomb (KV35), this king might have been Amenhotep II.

==== KV53 ====
KV53 is located north of KV29. It was discovered by Ayrton in 1905 or 1906. Although it was never properly planned it is reported to consist of a single chamber accessed by a shaft, rough workmen's huts were erected above its entrance. The only find from the chamber is an ostracon. Other ostraca and stelae/trail-pieces were found in the shaft. These items are contemporaneous with the huts build over the tomb. Given the lack of evidence it is unclear whether this tomb had ever contained a burial.

==== KV59 ====
KV59 is located in the wadi leading to KV34. It was first noted by James Burton in 1825 but there is no reference to its clearance and nothing is known about its possible contents. It is dated, on the grounds of its location, to the reign of Thutmose III.

==== KV61 ====
KV61 is located in the south-west wadi of the valley. It was discovered and excavated by Jones in 1910. It consists of a single chamber accessed by a shaft. When discovered, the doorway to the chamber was blocked but the tomb, which was partially filled with debris, yielded no finds. It has been suggested that the tomb once contained a burial, but that it was transferred elsewhere in its entirety, an idea which is perhaps unlikely. Another suggested theory is that the tomb was quarried and blocked up in anticipation of a burial which never took place. Given the lack of finds this tomb is undatable.

=== Tombs in the West Valley ===
==== WV24 ====
WV24 is located near the end of the West Valley, in between WV23 and WV25. This tomb was first noted by Wilkinson but was only recently cleared by Otto Schaden in 1991–92. It is a single chamber tomb accessed by a shaft. The left and rear wall of the chamber are irregular in shape which might suggest the tomb was left unfinished. The room was filled with debris, partially consisting of chippings from its cutting and partially flood deposits. Material found in the tomb dates from the Eighteenth Dynasty into late Roman and Coptic periods, which suggests the tomb was reused several times. Remains of intrusive burials from at least five individuals dating from the Twenty-second Dynasty were also recovered.

==== WVA ====
WVA is located near WV22 (tomb of Amenhotep III). It was first noted by Robert Hay and has been explored several times. It is a single chambered tomb accessed by a roughly hewn stair. Much of the tomb's original blocking is preserved. The room was partially filled with chips and debris in which were found the remains of numerous pottery fragments, along with jar sealings bearing the name of Amenhotep III. Other finds in the tomb are associated with tomb decoration. Other items reported from this tomb, such as fragments of a leather harness, possibly come from rubbish heaps outside the actual tomb. The blocking of its entrance and some of the items recovered from the tomb suggest it was at first used as a storage room related to WV22, other items could have originated from robbers' spoil left outside WV22. There is no evidence that this tomb ever received a burial.

=== Pits and tomb commencements ===
==== KVB-KVT ====
(see above)

== Other tombs ==
The following tombs might be noted here because they have similar layouts or served similar functions to the tombs listed above. These tombs however, unlike the preceding ones, yielded important information or have other notable features

- KV5: Multi-chambered tomb for some of the sons of Ramesses II, the largest tomb in the valley
- WV25: Although only a tomb commencement consisting of a stairwell and an unfinished sloping corridor, its proportions suggest it was intended as an Eighteenth Dynasty royal tomb. It is therefore believed to be the commencement of Akhenaten's Theban burial, abandoned after the move to Amarna
- KV36: Single chambered tomb accessed by a shaft, containing the burial of Maiherpri which was found relatively intact.
- KV39: Tomb of unusual layout. One of several tombs that are sometimes ascribed to Amenhotep I.
- KV46: Tomb accessed by a staircase, a descending corridor and a stair, which lead to the tombs single chamber. Containing the largely intact burials of Yuya and Tjuyu.
- KV54: A pit or tomb commencement, containing Tutankhamen's embalming cache.
- KV55: Tomb with a single chamber, accessed by a staircase and a sloping corridor. Contained royal burial equipment of at least two individuals (Tiye and Akhenaten) and a mummy which might be that of Akhenaten.
- KV56: Single chamber tomb accessed by a shaft. This tomb yielded a large amount of old jewellery and its contents have been interpreted as being either a cache of equipment belonging to Twosret and reburied here after her tomb (KV14) had been usurped by Setnakhte or as a relatively intact (but water damaged) burial of a child of Seti II and Twosret.
- KV58: Single chamber tomb accessed by a shaft. It contained gold foil, probably from a chariot (or chariots) originating from WV23 (tomb of Ay).
- KV60: Tomb with a single chamber accessed by a stair and a corridor. Possibly the burial of Sit-Ra called In, Hatshepsut's nurse. One of the two female mummies found in this tomb might belong to Hatshepsut.
- KV63: Single chambered tomb accessed by a shaft. It is recently discovered and excavation is still continuing.
- KV64 and KV65: Recently discovered entrances to unexcavated tombs.

== Dating ==
Most of the tombs listed above that contained datable material are from the Eighteenth Dynasty. Other tombs have also been dated to this period, either because of similarities in architecture or because of their location, several of these tombs were reused in later times. Differences in architectural style suggest that KV5 and KV12 were originally quarried in the Eighteenth Dynasty but that they were reused and expanded during the Nineteenth Dynasty. Other than those two tombs the only tomb whose quarrying can be dated to the Nineteenth Dynasty is KV13. As noted above it is possible that the last corridor and burial chamber of this tomb were of a later date than the rest of the tomb, which might be related to its reuse in the Twentieth Dynasty. KV3 and KV19 can be dated to that dynasty as well, based on their architecture, decoration and their intended occupants.

As was noted above, if the suggested ownership of KV41 has any grounds this would be one of the earliest tombs excavated in the area and it would pre-date the establishment of the royal necropolis in the valley.

== See also ==
- List of burials in the Valley of the Kings
