= KV56 =

Ancient Egyptian tomb aka "Gold Tomb"

KV56 or Gold Tomb
- Burial site of unknown royal child
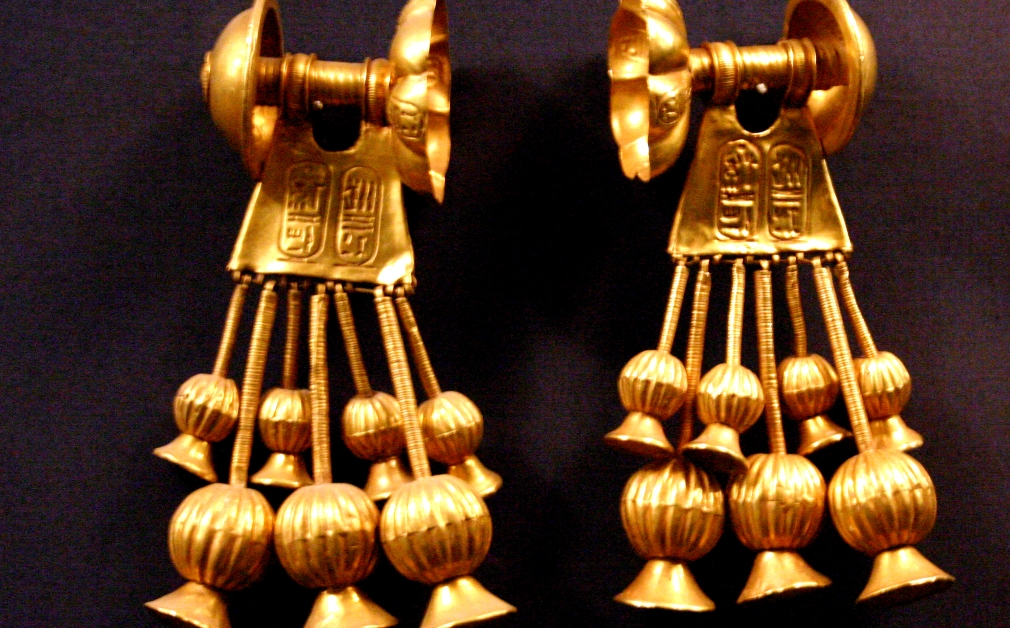
- Gold earrings from KV56

- Location within Egypt
- Coordinates: 25°44′24.2″N 32°36′03.9″E
- Location: East Valley of the Kings
- Discovered: 5 January 1908
- Excavated by: Edward R. Ayrton (1908); Nicholas Reeves (1998–2002)
- Layout: Shaft and chamber
- ← Previous; KV55 Next → KV57

Tomb KV56, also known as the Gold Tomb, is a tomb located in the Valley of the Kings, near Luxor, Egypt. It was discovered by Edward R. Ayrton in January 1908 and contained what is thought to be the intact burial of a royal child from the late Nineteenth Dynasty. The burial and casket have disintegrated, leaving a thin layer of gold leaf and stucco in the original location. Most famously the tomb contained spectacular gold and silver jewellery including earrings, rings, silver bracelets with the names of Seti II and Twosret inscribed, and a pair of small silver gloves. The original occupant of this tomb is unknown but was possibly an Eighteenth Dynasty queen.

== Location, discovery, and layout ==
The tomb was discovered on 5 January 1908 by Edward Ayrton who was excavating on behalf of Theodore Davis. Excavation was focused on the side valley leading towards the tomb of Amenhotep II; digging began on the northern side at the western end, close to the tomb of Ramesses VI (KV9). At a depth of 13 feet (4.0 m) below the current ground level, the mouth of a vertical shaft was encountered. The shaft was cut through debris for 5 feet (1.5 m), stabilised on three sides by walls of stacked limestone chips. The shaft descended another 15 feet (4.6 m) into the bedrock, opening out into a single chamber. Both the shaft and chamber were filled with flood debris.

The tomb consists of a vertical shaft measuring 8 by 5.6 feet (2.4 m × 1.7 m) cut 15 feet (4.6 m) into the bedrock. The shaft opens to the north to a single unfinished room; the north wall of the chamber has a stepped shape. The room is 25.2 feet (7.7 m) wide; it is the longest on the west side, at 19.05 feet (5.81 m), and shortest along the eastern wall, at 10.4 feet (3.2 m). The location and layout of the tomb indicate it was originally constructed in the late Eighteenth Dynasty; the shaft is of a similar depth to WV24 but of larger dimensions, and the single chamber would have been the largest of any comparable pit tomb in the Valley, had it been completed.

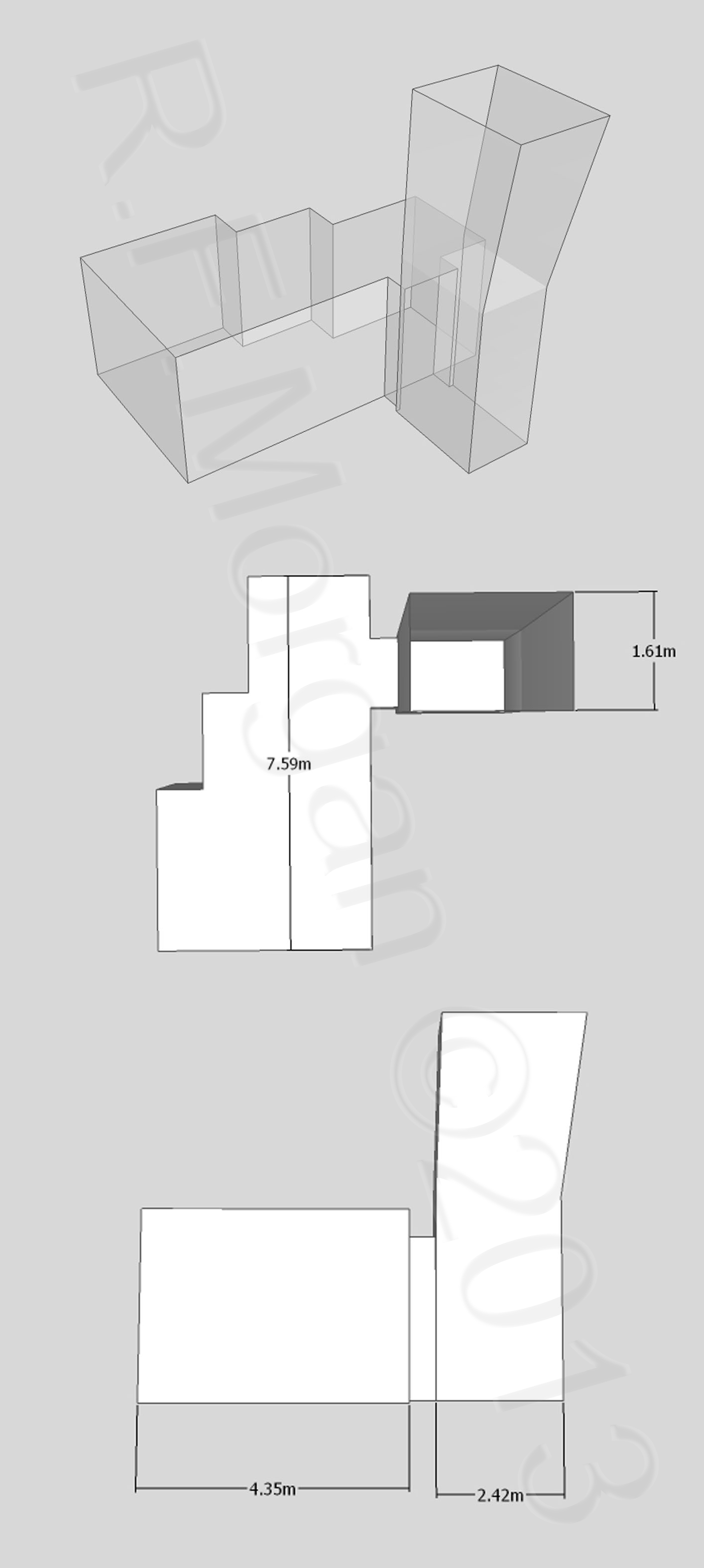
Schematic of KV56

== Excavation and contents ==
Ayrton removed the flood-washed debris, noting two distinct layers: a top section of flood debris, and a lower level of fine mud. The first finds were pottery and alabaster jars, both whole and fragmented, some of which bore the cartouches of Seti II and Ramesses II. Near the west wall, 6.5 inches (17 cm) from the floor, he encountered a layer of gold leaf and stucco 0.5 inches (1.3 cm) thick covering an area of 4 square feet (0.37 m^{2}). At the southern edge of this deposit was a collection of beads, stone items, and gold and silver objects. On either side of these were blue faience curls and plaques from an inlaid wig. A single uninscribed ushabti carved from alabaster was recovered.

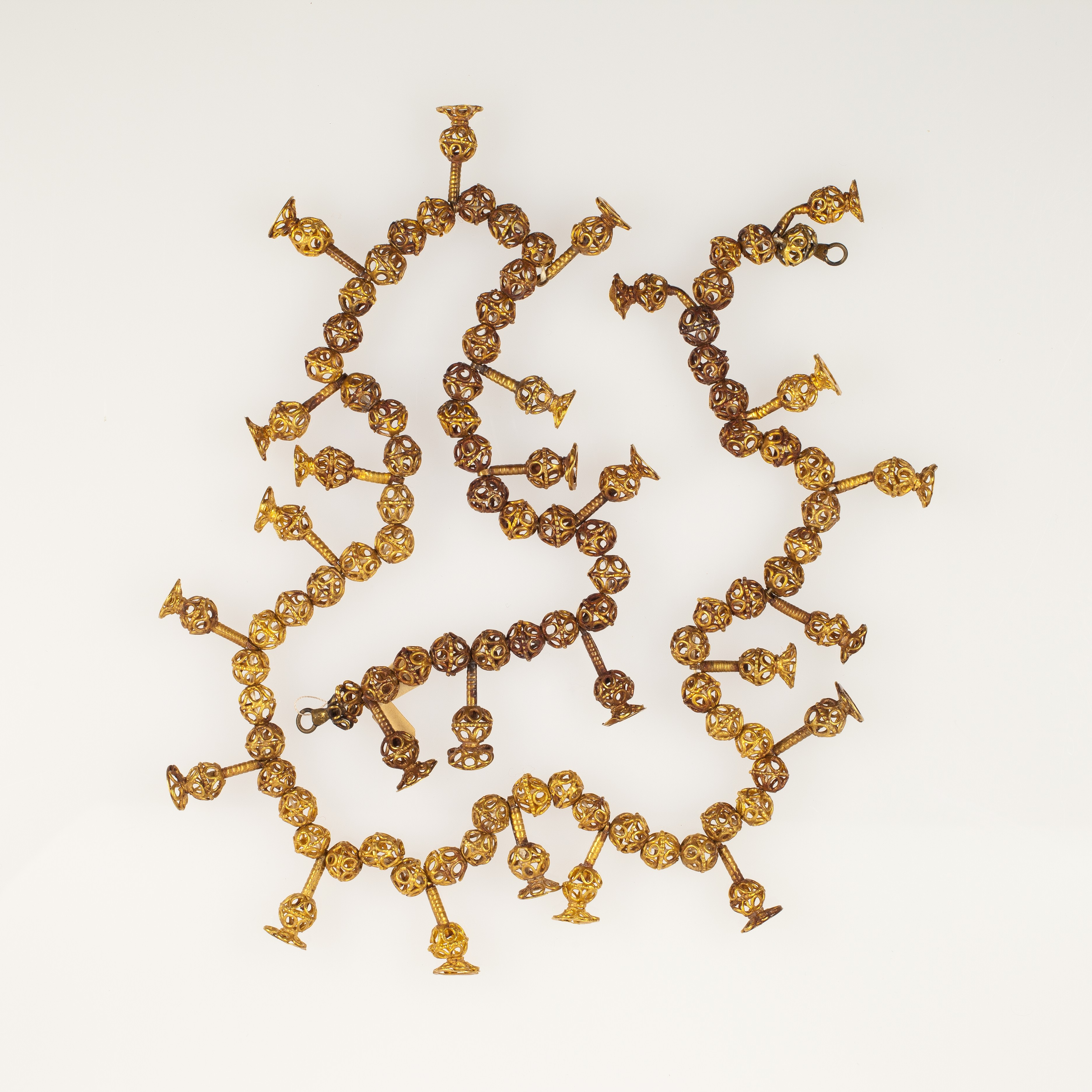
Gold filigree necklace composed of spherical and pomegranate-shaped beads

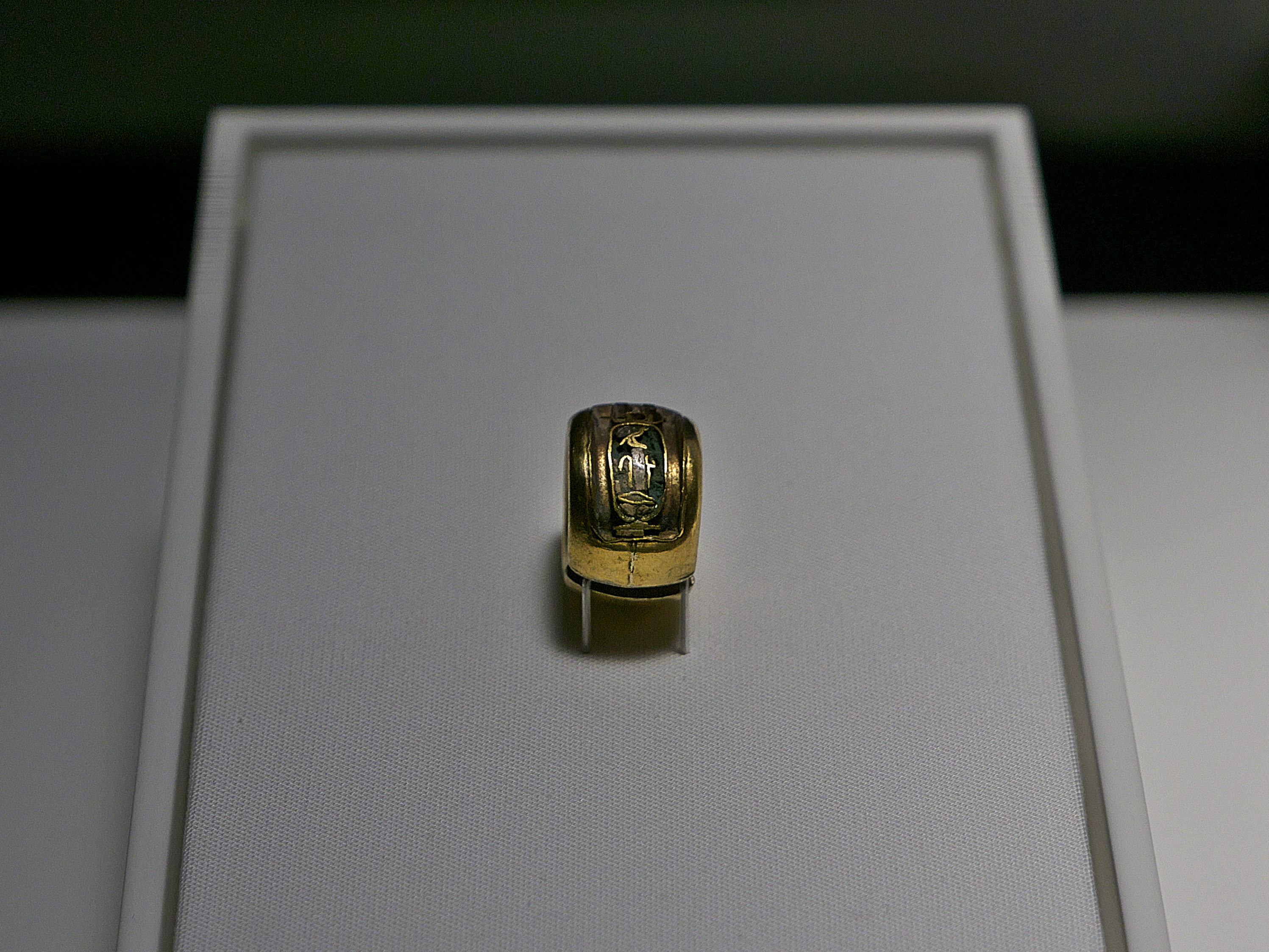
Gold earring of Queen Tausert (ca. 1188–1186 BC) found in tomb KV56. (British Museum)

The gold and silver jewellery recovered from this tomb are among the most spectacular ever uncovered in the Valley of the Kings, giving it the unofficial designation of the 'Gold Tomb'. The jewellery consisted of a gold circlet decorated with gold flowers whose petals bear the cartouches of Seti II and Twosret; large gold earrings inscribed with the names of Seti II; several pairs of ear studs and earrings of gold and electrum, decorated with beads and enamel; a gold filigree necklace of spherical and pomegranate-shaped beads; a pair of wedjat eyes and a heart amulet in electrum, two shells made of gold, gold amulets in the shape of flies, papyrus flowers, Taweret, heads of Hathor, and Heh, likely all from necklaces; a pair of silver or electrum bracelets depicting Twosret as queen standing before a seated Seti II, three further pairs of bracelets, one of which is for a child, and the plaque from another; nine gold rings, two of which are sized for a child; hands for a child made of silver foil for covering the hands of a mummy or for attaching to a coffin; a single silver sandal; and various gold foil plaques, amulets in the form of animals, and others of carnelian. Maspero and Ayrton suggested that the contents were deposited during the usurpation of Twosret's tomb by Setnakhte, or represents a robber's cache.

Cyril Aldred suggested that the area of gold foil and plaster was in fact the remains of a much rotted and flattened coffin. He suggests that, in his haste and without realising, Ayrton had cut through remains of wooden or other organic objects, which would have been reduced to a stain in the sediment, similar to the situation encountered by Guy Brunton in the tomb of Sithathoriunet at El Lahun. Robbers had entered the tomb in antiquity and looted most of the burial; their entrance was left open for some time, allowing mud and debris to wash in and accumulate before finally flood action sealed the tomb again. Reeves suggests that the tomb was robbed when already partially filled with mud, resulting in only pieces visible above the infill being taken. The silver hands, in Aldred's opinion, held the decayed hands of a mummy, as Ayrton retrieved eight of the gold rings from the mud inside. He suggests that the tomb was not a cache of objects but originally contained the burial of a young princess, likely not more than four years old.

=== Reinvestigation and original ownership ===
The tomb was reinvestigated in 1998 and systematically re-excavated between 1999 and 2002 by the Amarna Royal Tombs Project (ARTP), led by Nicholas Reeves. In the years since the initial excavation, the tomb had partially refilled with debris including photographic plates and plastic water bottles. In the centre of the chamber stood a pile of limestone blocks, likely remnants of the original seal, as they were left by Ayrton. The excavation recovered many additional faience wig curls, large quantities of thin gold foil, and additional necklace components and beads, including a gold foil plaque bearing the cartouche of Seti II.

Reeves has suggested that the intended form of the tomb was square with a single supporting pillar, a layout characteristic of an Eighteenth Dynasty queen's tomb. Furthermore, he suggests that the tomb was dug to receive the Theban reburial of an Amarna Period queen, possibly Nefertiti but more likely Kiya as the shaft is of sufficient width to admit the single burial shrine used in this period. The tomb is close to both KV55 and KV62, which are known to date to the late Eighteenth Dynasty, strengthening the argument for the initial use of the tomb being of contemporaneous dating. Excavations carried out in the area immediately surrounding KV56 yielded Amarna Period material including pottery, a wooden wig fragment from a coffin, a fragment of an alabaster canopic jar, and an ostracon of a priest drawn in Amarna style.
