= List of burials in the Valley of the Kings =

The following is a list of burials in the Valley of the Kings, in Thebes (modern Luxor, Egypt) and nearby areas.

The numbering system was established by John Gardner Wilkinson in 1821. Wilkinson numbered the 21 tombs known to him (some of which had been open since antiquity) according to their location, starting at the entrance to the valley and then moving south and west. Tombs that have been discovered since then have been allocated a sequential KV number (those in the Western Valley are known by the WV equivalent) in the order of their discovery.

Since the mid 20th century, Egyptologists have used the acronym "KV" (standing for Kings' Valley) to designate tombs located in the Valley of the Kings. Additionally, the acronym "WV" is also used to designate tombs located in the West Valley (of the Kings).

== Map ==
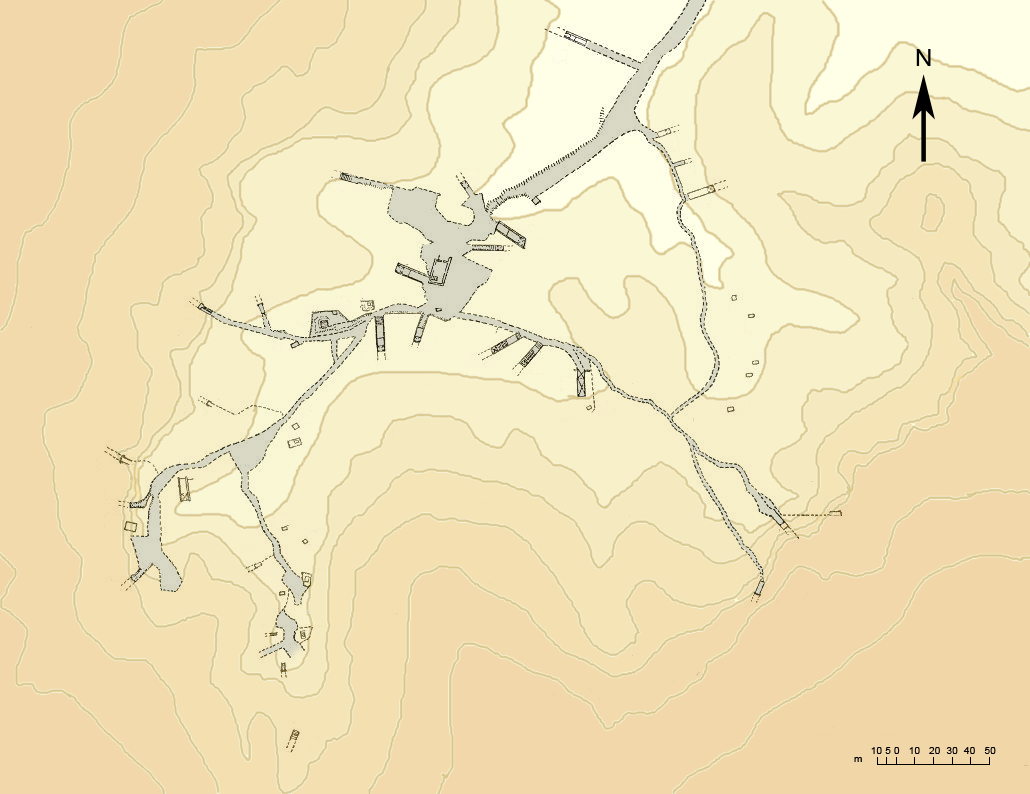

A map of the Valley of the Kings with locations of tombs marked

KV27

== Table legend ==
- Tomb is stable and open to visitors (Note: It's impossible to know when any given tomb will be open or closed to visitation.)
- Tomb is stable, but closed to visitors
- Tomb is unstable and/or unsafe and closed to visitors

== East Valley ==
Most of the open tombs in the Valley of the Kings are located in the East Valley, and this is where most tourists can be found.

Number	Time Period (Note: This column only includes the Dynasty in which the tomb was finished in. Numerous tombs found in the Valley of the Kings were reused during later periods that stretch into the Byzantine Empire.)	Discovered	Intended for	Short summary
KV1	20th Dynasty	Antiquity	Ramesses VII	
KV2	20th Dynasty	Antiquity	Ramesses IV	
KV3	20th Dynasty	Antiquity	Unidentified (Note: This tomb was for an unnamed son of Ramesses III.)	
KV4	20th Dynasty	Antiquity	Ramesses XI	While this tomb was intended for the burial of Pharaoh Ramesses XI, it was apparently abandoned while still incomplete.
KV5	19th Dynasty	1825	Ramesses II (sons)	With 120 known rooms and excavation work still underway, it is probably the largest tomb in the valley.
KV6	20th Dynasty	Antiquity	Ramesses IX	
KV7	19th Dynasty	Antiquity	Ramesses II	
KV8	19th Dynasty	Antiquity	Merneptah	
KV9	20th Dynasty	Antiquity	Ramesses V (Note: KV9 was later reused by Ramesses VI as his own.)	Also known as the Tomb of Memnon or La Tombe de la Métempsychose.
KV10	20th Dynasty	Antiquity	Amenmesse (Note: KV10 was intended for Amenmesse, but was later used instead by queens Baketwernel and Takhat.)	While intended for him, there is no direct evidence that Amenmesse was ever buried at this tomb.
KV11	20th Dynasty	Antiquity	Ramesses III	Also referred to as Bruce's Tomb, The Harper's Tomb.
KV12	18th Dynasty	Antiquity	Various	This was possibly used as a family tomb.
KV13	19th Dynasty	Antiquity	Bay (Note: KV13 was later used to entomb Amenherkhepshef and Mentuherkhepshef.)	
KV14	19th Dynasty	Antiquity	Tausret (Note: KV14 was later reused by Setnakhte.)	
KV15	19th Dynasty	Antiquity	Seti II	
KV16	19th Dynasty	1817	Ramesses I	
KV17	19th Dynasty	1817	Seti I	Also known as Belzoni's tomb, the tomb of Apis, or the tomb of Psammis, son of Necho.
KV18	20th Dynasty	Antiquity	Ramesses X	While this tomb was intended for the burial of Pharaoh Ramesses X, it was apparently abandoned while still incomplete.
KV19	20th Dynasty	1817	Ramesses VIII (Note: KV19 was intended for Ramesses VIII, but was later used instead by Mentuherkhepshef)	
KV20	18th Dynasty	1799	Thutmose I & Hatshepsut (Note: KV20 may have been re-cut and refurbished during the reign of Hatshepsut to accommodate the burial of both her and her father.)	This tomb has been closed since 1994 due to flooding.
KV21	18th Dynasty	1817	Queen ... (Note: It has been suggested that KV21 was used for a queen's burial. The two female mummies found within had their left arm crossed on their chest, a pose only used for queens.)	The original owner of this tomb is unknown, tombs KV22 to KV25 are part of the west valley mentioned below.
KV26	18th Dynasty	c.1835	Unknown	The original owner of this tomb is unknown.
KV27	18th Dynasty	c.1832	Unknown	The original owner of this tomb is unknown.
KV28	18th Dynasty	c.1832	Unknown	The original owner of this tomb is unknown.
KV29	Unknown	c.1832	Unknown	The original owner of this tomb is unknown.
KV30	18th Dynasty	1817	Unknown	Known as Lord Belmore's tomb.
KV31	18th Dynasty	1817	Unknown	Excavations which mapped KV31 in 2010 & 2011 found the remains of five mummified elite individuals dating to the Eighteenth Dynasty.
KV32	18th Dynasty	1898	Tiaa	
KV33	18th Dynasty	1898	Unknown	The original owner of this tomb is unknown.
KV34	18th Dynasty	1898	Thutmose III	
KV35	18th Dynasty	1898	Amenhotep II	During the Third Intermediate Period of Egypt over a dozen mummies were relocated here. Many of these included royalty as indicated by inscriptions on their burial wrappings. This tomb has been closed since 1994 due to flooding.
KV36	18th Dynasty	1899	Maiherpri	A noble from the time of Hatshepsut.
KV37	18th Dynasty	1899	Unknown	The original owner of this tomb is unknown.
KV38	18th Dynasty	1899	Thutmose I	KV38 was used for the reburial of Pharaoh Thutmose I of the Eighteenth Dynasty. Thutmose I was originally entombed in KV20 before being moved here by Thutmose III.
KV39	18th Dynasty	1899	Amenhotep I (Note: Unconfirmed)	
KV40	18th Dynasty	1899	Various royal individuals	Burials date to the time of Thutmose IV and Amenhotep III, with members of their family being interred in it. Later intrusive burials from the 22nd Dynasty are also present.
KV41	18th Dynasty	1899	Not used	This has been described as a shaft rather than a tomb possibly belonging to Queen Tetisheri.
KV42	18th Dynasty	1900	Merytre-Hatshepsut	This tomb was originally constructed for Hatshepsut-Meryetre, the wife of Thutmose III. She was never buried here though, and the tomb was later reused by Sennefer (mayor of Thebes during the reign of Amenhotep II).
KV43	18th Dynasty	1903	Thutmose IV	
KV44	18th Dynasty	1901	Unknown	The original owner of this tomb is unknown.
KV45	18th Dynasty	1902	Userhet	Tomb of a noble
KV46	18th Dynasty	1905	Yuya & Thuya	The parents of Queen Tiye. Until the discovery of the tomb of Tutankhamun, this was the best preserved tomb to be found in the Valley.
KV47	19th Dynasty	1905	Siptah	
KV48	18th Dynasty	1906	Amenemipet called Pairy	
KV49	18th Dynasty	1906	Storage	Tomb was possibly a store room.
KV50	18th Dynasty	1906	Animals (pets)	Tombs contain animal burials, which were possibly the pets of Amenhotep II, whose tomb is nearby.
KV51	18th Dynasty	1906	Animals (pets)	Tombs contain animal burials, which were possibly the pets of Amenhotep II, whose tomb is nearby.
KV52	18th Dynasty	1906	Animals (pets)	Tombs contain animal burials, which were possibly the pets of Amenhotep II, whose tomb is nearby.
KV53	18th Dynasty	1906	Unknown	The original owner of this tomb is unknown.
KV54	18th Dynasty	1907	Embalming cache	This was probably an embalming cache for the tomb of Tutankhamun.
KV55	18th Dynasty	1907	Smenkhkare or Akhenaten	This tomb might be another mummy cache, and once possibly contained the burials of several Amarna Period royals – Tiye and Smenkhkare/Akhenaten.
KV56	19th Dynasty	1908	Unknown	Known as the Gold Tomb, the original owner of this tomb is unknown. Items with names of Ramesses II, Seti II and Tausret were found.
KV57	18th Dynasty	1908	Horemheb	This tomb has been closed since 1994 due to flooding.
KV58	18th Dynasty	1909	Unknown	Known as the Chariot Tomb, the original owner of this tomb remains unknown. Gold foil contains names of Tutankhamun and Ay
KV59	Unknown	c.1885	Not used	This tomb appears to have been unused
KV60	18th Dynasty	1903	Sitre In	KV60 contains the mummy of Sitre In, who was a royal nurse of Hatshepsut. Another mummy was found that could be Hatshepsut herself, this is yet to be proven by DNA.
KV61	Unknown	1910	Not used	This tomb appears to have been unused.
KV62	18th Dynasty	1922	Tutankhamun	Perhaps the most famous discovery of modern Western archaeology was made here by Howard Carter on November 4, 1922, with clearance and conservation work continuing until 1932. It was the first royal tomb to be discovered still largely intact (although tomb robbers had entered it), and was for many years the last major discovery in the valley.
KV63	18th Dynasty	2005	Storage	Initially believed to be a royal tomb, it is now believed to have been a storage chamber for the mummification process.
KV64	18th Dynasty	2011	Nehmes-Bastet	The tomb of a priestess, discovered in January 2011. The tomb was excavated in 2012 and was shown to have been used in the 18th as well as in the 22nd dynasty. The Lady Nehmesbastet lived during the 22nd dynasty.

== West Valley ==
The numbering the West Valley follows in sequence to that of the East Valley, and there are only five known burials/pits in the valley.

Number	Time Period	Discovered	Intended for	Comments
WV22	18th Dynasty	1799	Amenhotep III	The badly damaged mummy of Amenhotep III was later moved from the tomb, and restored in Year 13 of Smendes at KV35. This tomb was re-excavated in the 1990s, and was reopened to the public in October, 2025.
WV23	18th Dynasty	1816	Ay	The contents of KV58 likely originated from WV23, as Ay's name occurs more frequently than that of Tutankhamun.
WV24	18th Dynasty	c.1832	Unknown	"WV24" is an unfinished tomb that may have been intended for a high ranking noble. It could have also been built as a storage chamber for overflow from the royal burial as seen with WV23 and WVA.
WV25	18th Dynasty	1817	Unknown	This tomb may have been started as the Theban burial of Akhenaten, but it was never finished.
KV65	18th Dynasty	2018	Unknown	An unfinished tomb entrance, discovered in 2018
WVA	18th Dynasty	1845	Storage	This was a storage chamber for Amenhotep III's tomb which is located nearby.

== See also ==
- List of burials in the Valley of the Queens
- Minor tombs in the Valley of the Kings
- List of Theban tombs
- List of pharaonic tombs
- Theban Mapping Project
