= WV24 =

Ancient Egyptian tomb in the Valley of the Kings

- Burial site of unknown
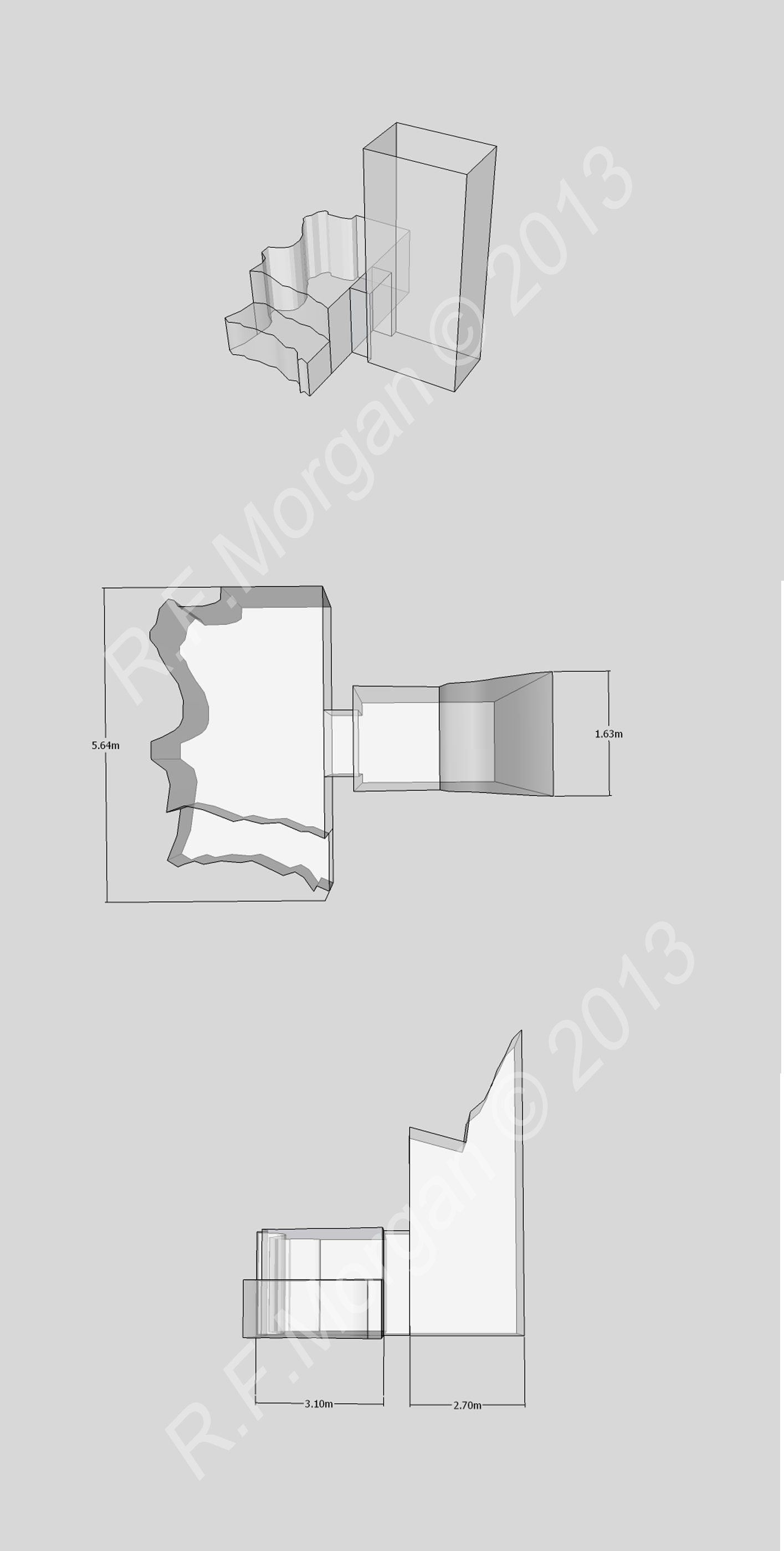
- Schematic of WV24

- Location within Egypt
- Coordinates: 25°44′28.2″N 32°35′33.2″E
- Location: West Valley of the Kings
- Discovered: before 1832
- Excavated by: Otto Schaden (1991)
- Layout: Shaft and chamber
- ← Previous; WV23 Next → WV25

Tomb WV24 is an ancient Egyptian tomb located in the western arm of the Valley of the Kings. It was reported by Robert Hay and John Wilkinson in the 1820s and visited by Howard Carter; however, it was not fully explored until Otto Schaden's excavations in 1991.

== Location, architecture, and contents ==
WV24 is located 12 metres (39 ft) from the entrance of WV25 and, like this tomb, is unfinished. WV24 dates to the Eighteenth Dynasty and consists of a well-cut vertical shaft that opens, via a large doorway, to a single chamber. The room is roughly rectangular but is uneven at the eastern end and has a low bench cut along one side. The tomb was left unfinished, a theory supported by finds of a wooden mallet and fragments of chisels left by masons.

Given its close association with WV25, Richard H. Wilkinson and Otto Schaden suggest it may have been intended for a high ranking noble, or perhaps it was meant to be a storage chamber for overflow from the royal burial, as seen with WV23 and WVA. The amount of work done of the cutting of both this tomb and WV25 suggest the tombs were commenced and abandoned at the same time.

The tomb does not appear to have received an Eighteenth Dynasty burial. Fragments of furniture, glass, ivory and gold dating to the Eighteenth Dynasty found in the tomb probably originate from WV23. However, WV24 was used in the Third Intermediate Period for the burial of at least five individuals, including a baby. Late Roman and Coptic pottery were also recovered from the tomb.
