= WV25 =

Ancient Egyptian tomb in the Valley of the Kings

- Burial site of unknown
- Location within Egypt
- Coordinates: 25°44′28.3″N 32°35′33.6″E
- Location: West Valley of the Kings
- Discovered: 1817
- Excavated by: Giovanni Battista Belzoni (1817); Otto Schaden (1972)
- Decoration: Undecorated
- Layout: Straight axis
- ← Previous; WV24 Next → KV26

Tomb WV25 is an unfinished and undecorated tomb in the West Valley of the Valley of the Kings, Egypt. It is the beginning of a royal tomb, and is thought to be the start of Akhenaten's Theban tomb. It was discovered by Giovanni Belzoni in 1817; he found eight Third Intermediate Period mummies inside. The tomb was excavated in 1972 by the University of Minnesota's Egyptian Expedition (UMEE) led by Otto Schaden. The project uncovered pieces of the eight mummies, along with artefacts from a late Eighteenth Dynasty royal burial.

== Discovery ==
The tomb was discovered in 1817 by the Italian explorer Giovanni Belzoni during his excavations in the Valley of the Kings. His investigation commenced close to the tomb of Ay (WV23), which he had discovered the previous year. The entrance was buried at a shallow depth and found to be blocked with large rocks. Returning the following day, further digging revealed a "well-built wall of stones of various sizes." Belzoni ordered the construction of a battering-ram, made from a large pole and a palm tree trunk, and used it to breach the blocking.

We immediately entered, and found ourselves on a staircase eight feet wide and ten feet high, at the bottom of which were four mummies in their cases, lying flat on the ground with their heads towards the outside. Farther on were four more, lying in the same direction.

Belzoni noted that the mummies were much alike in their painted and varnished cases, although one was covered in a pall. Another was wrapped in finer-quality linen and garlands of leaves and flowers; it appeared to be re-wrapped as, upon investigation, all that remained of the mummy was yellow-coloured bones. Two large metal plates, one with wedjat-eyes, and the other in the shape of a winged disc were found in the wrappings.

== Location and layout ==
The tomb is located approximately 100 metres (330 ft) east of WV23. Carefully cut into a sloping hillside, the tomb is unfinished. The entrance stair and the first sloping passageway were completed before the tomb was abandoned. The entrance descent consists of seven stairs built of mud and rock on top of hard gravel; the lower eighteen stairs were cut from solid rock. The lowest stair and its meeting of the door posts was noted as being similar to the tomb of Ay. Schaden suggests that the tomb was abandoned due to a precarious overhang of boulders above entrance, or due to the poor quality of the upper rock layer. Another reason for abandonment would be Akhenaten's move of the capital to Amarna, if the tomb was indeed initiated for him.

== Re-investigation ==
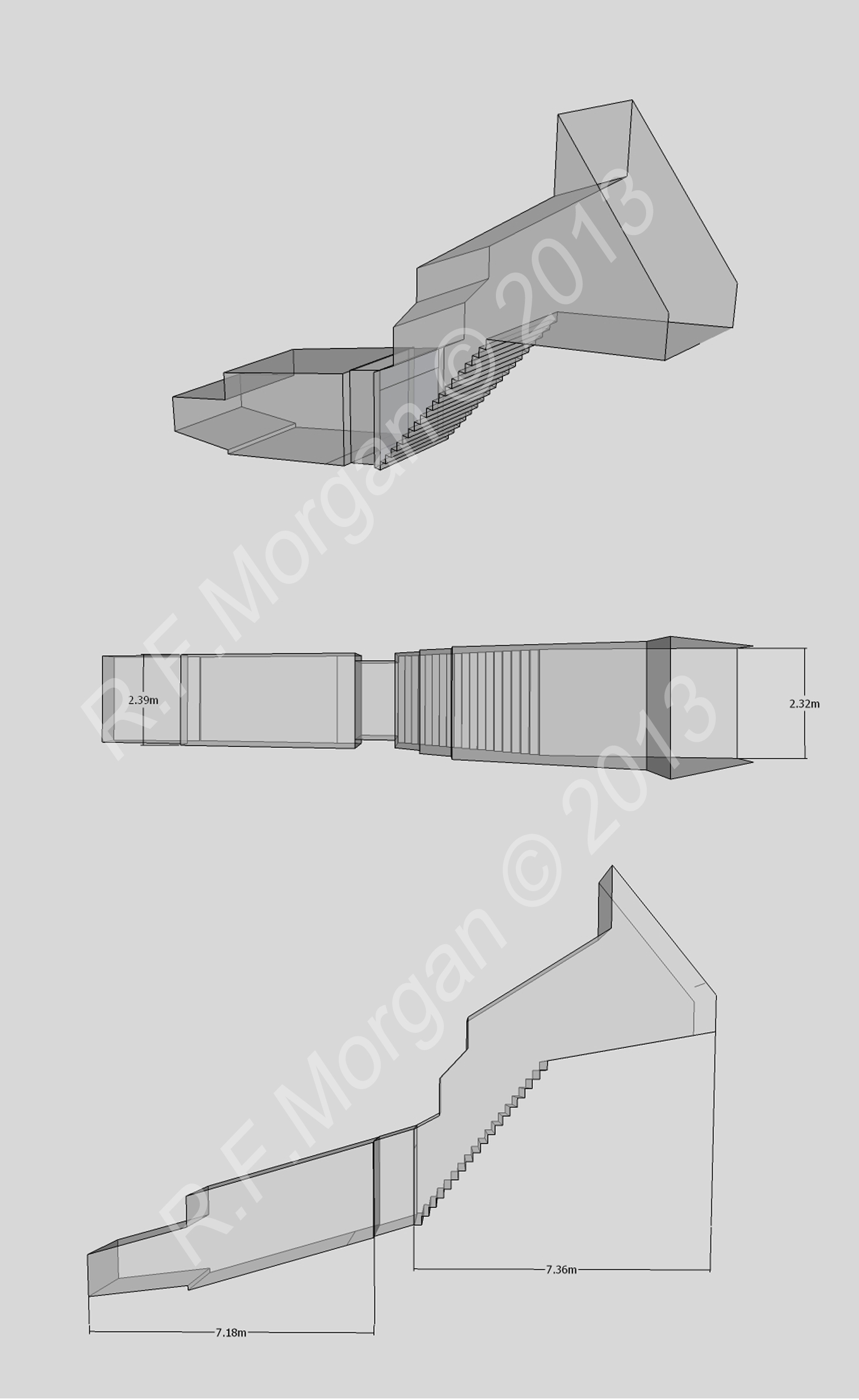
Schematic of WV25

The tomb was excavated in mid-1972 by the University of Minnesota's Egyptian Expedition (UMEE) led by Otto Schaden. Initial excavations focused on attempting to locate foundation deposits, a common feature of royal tombs of the Eighteenth Dynasty. No deposit was found despite extensive trenching. However, large quantities of late Eighteenth Dynasty pottery were encountered in the course of those efforts. A single foundation pit was later discovered on the eastern side of the entrance by Richard H. Wilkinson in 2001; it was found relatively intact but empty. Wilkinson suggests that the deposit may have been discovered by Belzoni and emptied by him. Additionally, excavations the year prior, in 2000, found an area of churned up ground on the western side of the entrance, likely the product of Belzoni's work, which Wilkinson posits destroyed the foundation deposit on that side.

Excavation in the interior of the tomb found the stairway contained rock and fill; portions of the upper stairs, mummy wrappings and fragments were also encountered. The most significant find in this section was an ostracon depicting a seated man sketched in red ink and dating to the late Eighteenth Dynasty. No trace remained of the blocking at the bottom of the stairs encountered by Belzoni. The chamber at the base of the stairs contained the remains of the mummies encountered by Belzoni; they likely date to the Twenty-first to Twenty-second Dynasties based on the presence of cartonnage and a faience ushabti. Parts of the "yellow skeleton" were also found. Other artefacts from the tomb indicated a royal burial – parts of faience uraei, portions of a wooden flail, and the ears and feet of two wooden life-size guardian statues like the pair found in the tomb of Tutankhamun (KV62). On the basis of these finds, Schaden suggested that the tomb, if used at all in the late Eighteenth Dynasty, may have initially contained a royal burial, or that a royal burial, possibly Ay's (represented by the "yellow skeleton"), was relocated to the tomb. He also considers that the royal material is intrusive and instead comes from WV23, being deposited in WV25 by floodwater.

== Intended ownership ==
The tomb is generally thought to be one of two candidates for Akhenaten's Theban tomb, the other being WV23. The tomb was certainly begun to receive a royal burial; Belzoni commented on the royal scale of the tomb in his account of its discovery. Later, Elizabeth Thomas drew attention to the royal nature of the projected layout of the tomb and suggested that the re-wrapped yellow skeleton possibly indicated a royal cache. Additionally, she mentioned the presence of a granite sarcophagus fragment. Schaden located this uninscribed pink granite fragment and identified it as part of a lid. He considered it to be of unknown origin, as it cannot be part of Ay's lid, of red granite, as it was found intact.
