= WVA =

Ancient Egyptian tomb in the Valley of the Kings

- Burial site of nobody (storage chamber)
- Location within Egypt
- Coordinates: 25.7433°N 32.5974°E
- Location: West Valley of the Kings
- Discovered: 25 February 1845
- Excavated by: Karl Richard Lepsius (1845); Sakuji Yoshimura and Jiro Kondo (1993–94)

WVA, also known as KV A, is a small single room tomb in the Western Valley of the Kings associated with WV22, the tomb of Pharaoh Amenhotep III of the Eighteenth Dynasty of Egypt. Located 60 metres (200 ft) south of the tomb of Amenhotep III, it was discovered by Karl Richard Lepsius in 1845; he recorded that it contained pottery bearing the name of a king. The tomb was re-excavated in the 1990s by a team from Waseda University led by Sakuji Yoshimura and Jiro Kondo. They found the tomb contained assorted jars and sealings, indicating the tomb was likely used as storage for overflow from the nearby tomb of Amenhotep III.

== Discovery, location, and excavation ==
The tomb is located 60 metres (200 ft) south of the tomb of Amenhotep III, dug into the base of the cliffs. It was discovered by Karl Richard Lepsius in 1845. He notes in his publication that the tomb entrance was buried 10 feet (3.0 m) below ground level and contained "some earthenware vases... which contained the name of a king hitherto unknown."

=== Re-excavation ===
The tomb was re-excavated in the 1990s by a team from Waseda University led by Sakuji Yoshimura and Jiro Kondo. The doorway preserves most of its original stone blocking, one of the only tombs in the valley to do so. The objects recovered consisted mostly of pottery sherds, consistent with earlier reports of the contents; the sherds most commonly represent wine jars and blue painted pottery. Also found were wine jar stands, jar sealings, and jar dockets dating to years 32 and 37 of Amenhotep III's reign. However, no items were found to indicate that the tomb itself ever contained a burial. The presence of ostraca, some of which were used as paint palettes, and items such as a length of rope, indicate that the tomb was likely used by craftsmen during the cutting and decorating of the nearby royal tomb and then later utilized to store overflow from the tomb itself. However, Kondo cautions that "the precise nature and contents of WVA should be assessed with caution" due to the mixed nature of finds in the area immediately surrounding the tomb.
