= KV27 =

Ancient Egyptian tomb in the Valley of the Kings

- Burial site of Unknown
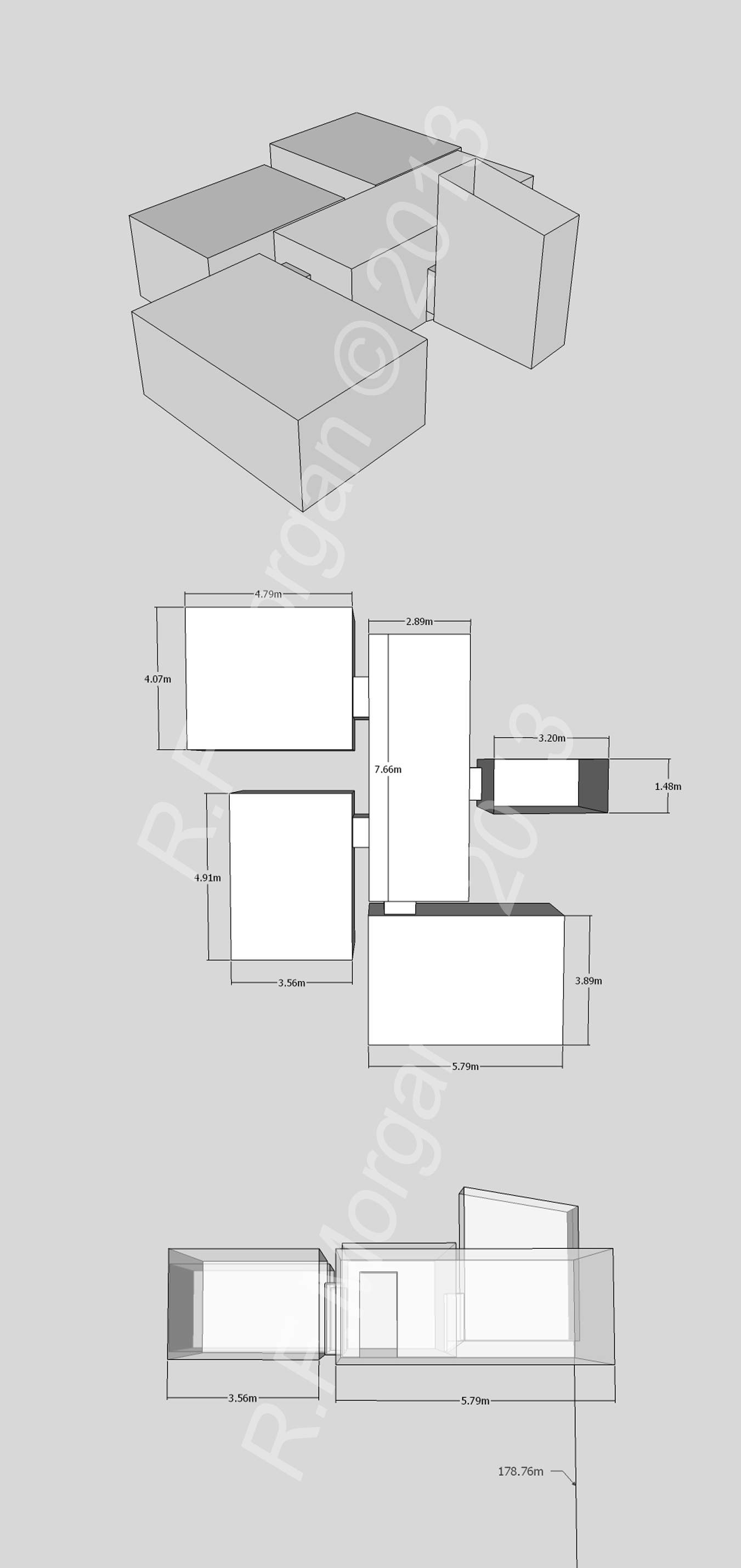
- Schematic of KV27

- Location within Egypt
- Coordinates: 25°44′23.1″N 32°36′11.2″E
- Location: East Valley of the Kings
- Discovered: before 1832
- Excavated by: Donald P. Ryan (1993, 2006)
- Layout: Shaft and chamber(s)
- ← Previous; KV26 Next → KV28

Tomb KV27 is located in the Valley of the Kings in Egypt. This tomb was visited by John Wilkinson, but was not fully explored until the 1990s, by Donald P. Ryan of Pacific Lutheran University. The tomb consists of four rooms and is undecorated; nothing is known about its occupant.

== Location, discovery and layout ==
KV27 is located between tombs KV21 and KV28 in a side wadi that branches off the main valley. The tomb has a simple layout, consisting of a shaft and four rooms. It is most similar to KV30 and appears to be an expanded version of a shaft tomb with a single room, or it may represent an architectural halfway between a single-roomed shaft tomb and those which have multiple rooms opening from one or more corridors. An unusual feature of the tomb is the plastered ramp (initially thought to be a sealed burial shaft) leading from the main chamber (B) to a side chamber (C). Pottery excavated from the tomb dates to the mid-Eighteenth Dynasty.

The original excavator for this tomb is unknown, and no records exist of its discovery. Richard Pococke perhaps observed its location during his tour of Egypt. It was certainly known to Wilkinson, and described briefly by Eugène Lefébure as containing pieces of a mummy. The tomb was probably investigated by Auguste Mariette in 1859.

== Re-investigation and contents ==
Excavation of the tomb was undertaken by the Pacific Lutheran University's Valley of the Kings Project in 1993 and 2006. The tomb entrance was known to be used by local antique sellers to escape the heat. However, humans weren't the only ones who used the tomb as a family of dogs were found living there in 1990. During the 1993 season the shaft was partially excavated, yielding small amounts of pottery and fragmented remnants of the burial including wood, gold leaf, and wrappings.

The Project returned in 2006 to undertake a fuller excavation. The shaft was fully cleared and contained modern items such as rubbish, and modern souvenirs. Remains of the original mudbrick blocking were encountered at the base of the shaft. The tomb was found to be almost entirely full of flood debris. The first chamber (Chamber B) was almost entirely excavated, leaving only a small column of debris as a stratigraphic record. This chamber contained very few artefacts; only fragmentary stone vessels, pottery, and faience were found, along with some human metacarpals.

Side Chamber C was almost entirely full of pottery sherds, mostly from white-washed storage jars. The presence of large stones mixed with the ceramics suggests that the tomb suffered a "catastrophic flooding event with a powerful torrent of water pouring into the tomb... which violently smashed and mixed the tomb contents." Pieces of Late Period and Coptic pottery found scattered throughout the fill indicate that the tomb was still relatively free of debris in these periods. This chamber proved to contain the majority of the human remains uncovered thus far; these included a partial skull, vertebrae, ribs, and a right arm. The remains are thought to be from a single individual aged at least thirty years. Animal bones were also present, although these are likely the remains of food mummies for the deceased. The chamber also contained two inscribed fragments of a canopic jar naming a certain "god's father" Userhet; Userhet is thought to be the owner of KV45 where three of his canopic jars were excavated in 1902. The excavation of the remaining two chambers was saved for a future season. At the conclusion of the 2006 excavation, a steel door was added to secure the tomb. The wall around the shaft was repaired; additionally, a diversion wall was built to protect from flooding.

As of 2007, the tomb stores the pottery found in it; other finds are stored in KV21 for flood protection.
