= 317a and 317b mummies =

Daughters of Egyptian pharaoh Tutankhamun

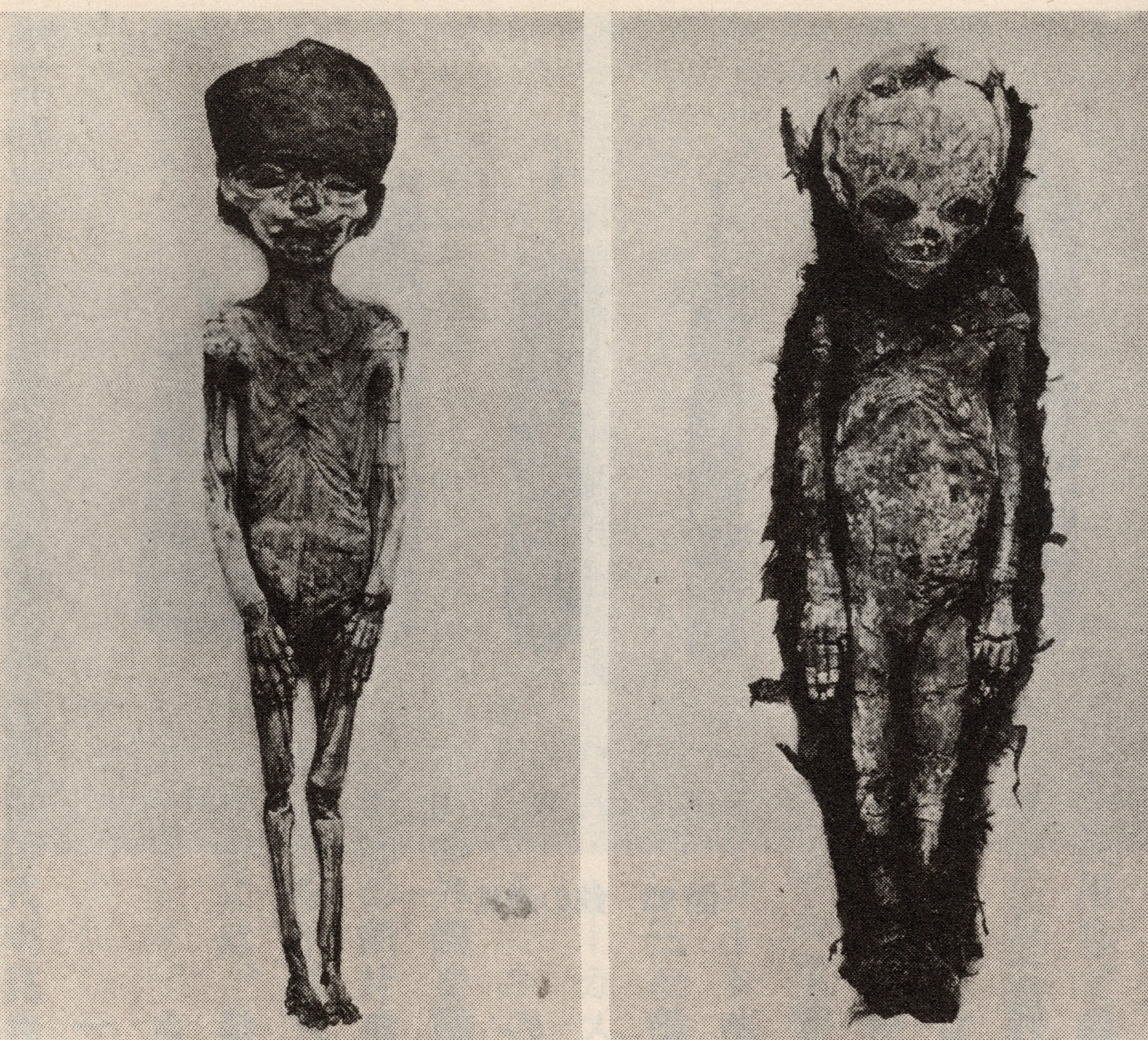
- 317a (left) and 317b (right) as photographed in the 1930s, shortly after their unwrapping
- Died: before or in 1323 BC
- Burial: Tomb of Tutankhamun
- Dynasty: Eighteenth Dynasty of Egypt
- Father: Tutankhamun
- Mother: Presumably Ankhesenamun

Mummies 317a and 317b are the remains of two infant daughters of Tutankhamun, a pharaoh of the Eighteenth Dynasty of Egypt. Their mother, who has been tentatively identified through DNA testing as the mummy KV21A, is presumed to be Ankhesenamun, his only known wife. 317a was born prematurely at 5–6 months' gestation, and 317b was born at or near full term. They are assumed to have been stillborn or died shortly after birth.

They were buried in their father's tomb in the Valley of the Kings, which was discovered by the Egyptologist Howard Carter in 1922. Their bodies were mummified and wrapped in the same style as high-status adults and 317a was fitted with a gilded mummy mask; 317b's mask was too small for her and was found in 1907 among the leftovers from Tutankhamun's mummification and funerary feast cached in KV54. Each girl was buried in miniature two-coffin sets of the same design used by nobility. Both babies were unnamed, as the coffin inscriptions call them only the "Osiris", a generic term for the deceased, so they are known by the numbers assigned by Carter during his excavation.

They have been examined several times since their discovery. 317a was unwrapped by Carter in 1925 and both mummies were examined by the anatomist Douglas Derry in 1932. X-ray imaging and serological testing was carried out on 317b in the 1970s and both were CT-scanned in 2008, where the remains were found to be in a fragile and degraded condition. No cause of death could be determined for either child and neither child had any observable conditions or diseases. The 1970s diagnosis of 317b with conditions such as Sprengel's deformity and spina bifida was determined to be a result of post-mortem fracturing and dislocation of bones.

== Discovery ==
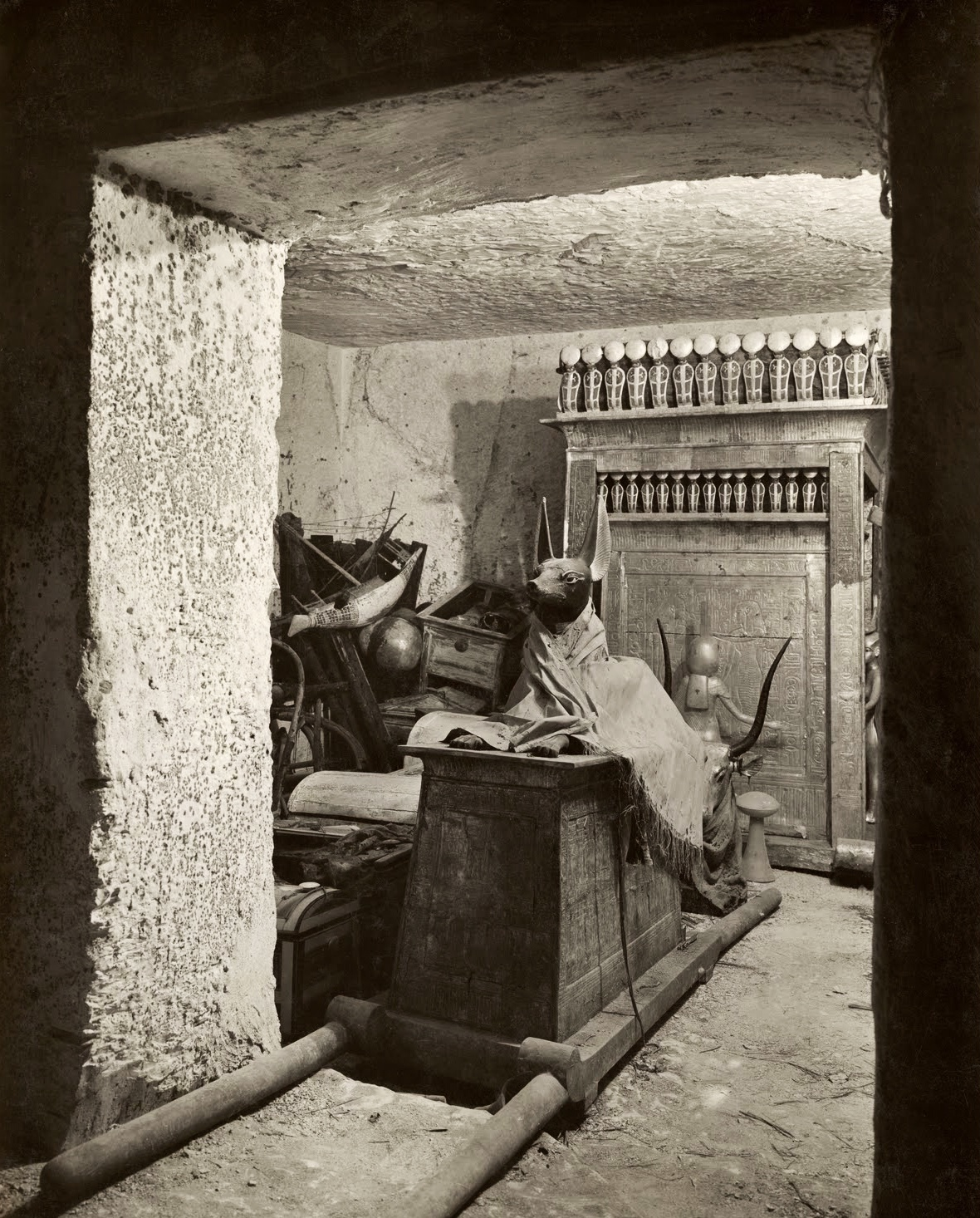
View of the treasury. The box numbered 317 is visible in the corner, to the left of the Anubis Shrine

The mummies were buried in Tutankhamun's tomb, in the north-eastern corner of the treasury. Their coffins were found in an open wooden box atop a stack of items that included ushabti shrines, boxes, and a model boat; beside them sat another miniature nested coffin set containing a lock of hair belonging to Tutankhamun's grandmother, Tiye. The box's lid was once tied and sealed but had been removed by robbers in antiquity, and was placed behind the neighbouring box.

Closeup of the box numbered 317 in-situ.

The two coffins were placed side by side, head to toe; chips had been taken off the toe of the larger coffin (317b) in order to close the lid. Bands of linen at the throat, middle, and ankles sealed the outer coffins; each was secured by mud seals stamped with the necropolis seal of a jackal over nine captives. Inside each outer coffin was a gilded inner coffin, which in turn contained the mummified and wrapped body of a stillborn child "preserved in accordance with burial custom of the Eighteenth Dynasty". 317a was the smaller of the two mummies and had a gilded cartonnage mask; the other mummy, 317b, was a little larger and did not have a mask. Carter unwrapped the smaller mummy, 317a, some time between their discovery and their 1932 examination by anatomist Douglas Derry, who noted the unwrapped state. In 1929 the coffins were transferred to the Egyptian Museum in Cairo but the mummies were stored separately in the Faculty of Medicine at Cairo University after their 1932 autopsies.

== Coffins ==
The mummies of 317a and 317b were each provided with an individual set of inner and outer mummy-shaped coffins. The two sets are nearly identical in design, but differ slightly in size with the outer coffins of 317a and 317b measuring 49.5 centimetres (19.5 in) and 57.7 centimetres (22.7 in) long respectively. Their form and decoration imitate those used by the nobility and private individuals of the period. The outer coffins have a black-based design ornamented by gilding. The deceased is depicted as a wrapped mummy wearing a blue and gold striped wig, and a broad collar with falcon-headed terminals. The arms are crossed on the chest and the hands are fisted but hold no emblems. A vulture spreads its wings over the abdomen and gilded vertical and horizontal bands of inscription invoke the deities of the deceased. The goddesses Nephthys and Isis (with two djed-pillars) are depicted kneeling on the top of the head and on the base of the feet respectively. The rest of the surface is filled with black resin. The lid of each outer coffin was attached to the trough by eight tenons.

The inner coffins have a similar design but are entirely covered in gold foil. The hieroglyphic inscriptions on both sets of coffins refer "only to a nameless "Osiris" (i.e. the deceased)". As no names are specified for the children, they are known instead by the object numbers assigned by Carter in the course of the excavation.

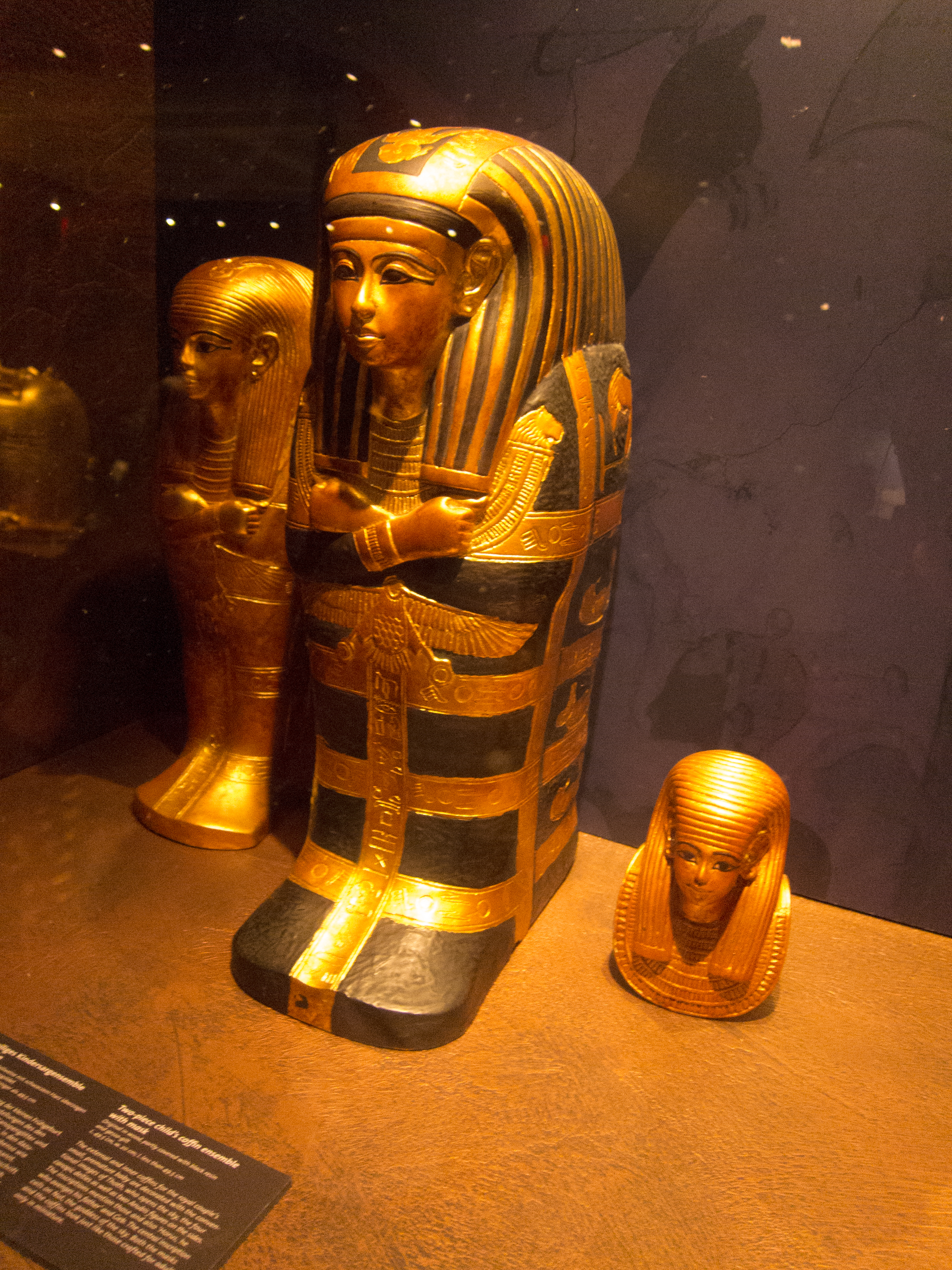
Replica coffins and mummy mask of 317a

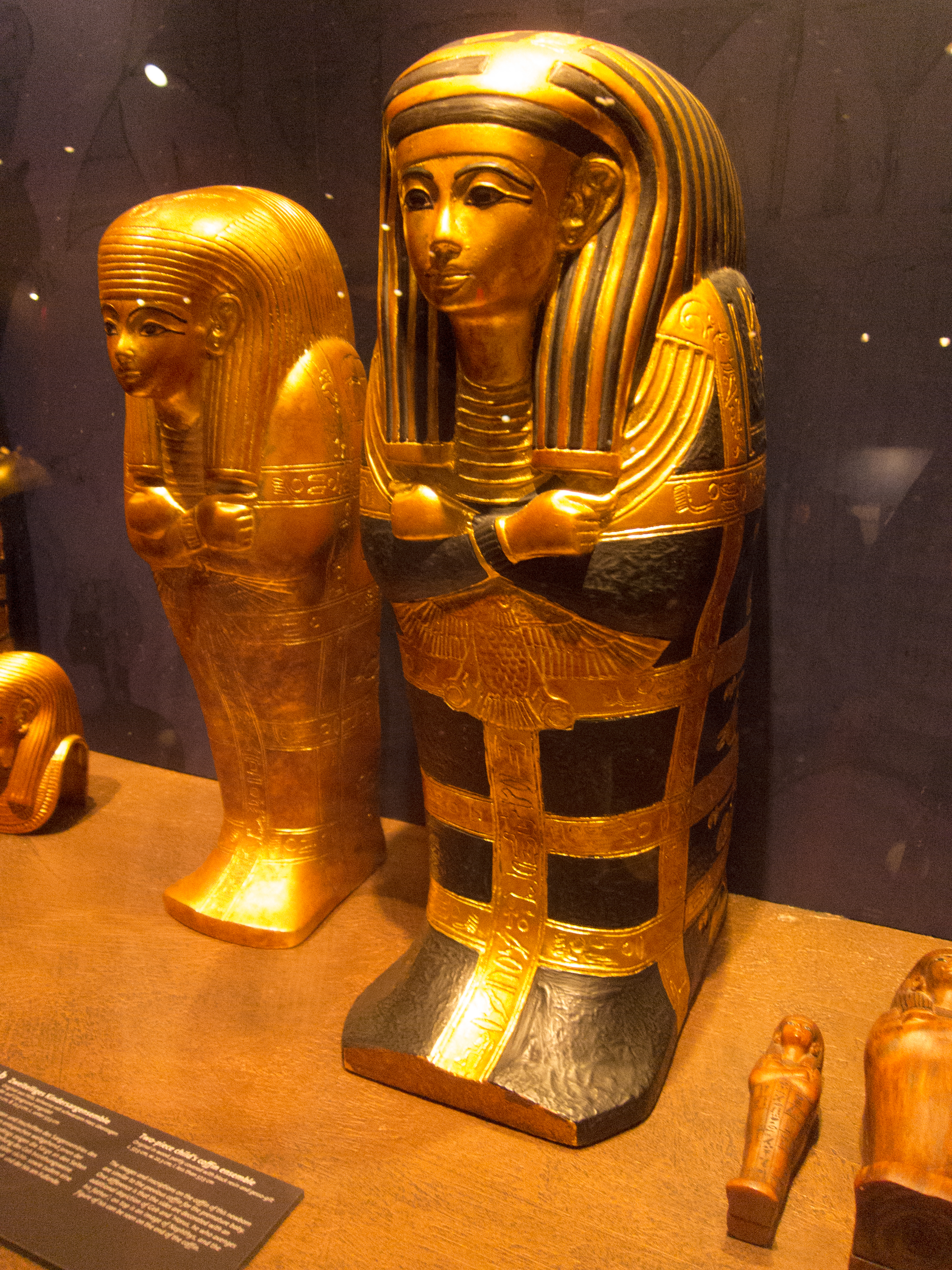
Replica coffin set of 317b

== Mummies ==
=== 317a ===
==== Initial examination ====
Carter is said to have unwrapped this mummy in 1925, although his notes are undated. The head was covered by a gilded death mask that was "several sizes too large". The linen wrappings were secured by five horizontal bands and two triple longitudinal bands over the front, back, and sides. The wrappings were 1.5 centimetres (0.59 in) thick and noted to be in poor condition, with pads over the chest, legs and feet to provide shape. During the 1932 autopsy by anatomist Douglas Derry, the mummy was measured to be 25.75 centimetres (10.14 in) long. He concluded the mummy was likely female and estimated the age to be no more than five months' gestation. The skin was noted as being "of a greyish colour, very shrunken and brittle", with the bones of the chest and hands clearly visible. The body was positioned with the legs straight and the hands placed on the front of the thighs. There was no sign of the typical abdominal incision used to remove the organs. The mummy lacked eyebrows and eyelashes, presumably due to its early gestational age, but light-coloured silky hairs (lanugo) were present on the head. The eyelids were slightly open as a result of shrinkage during the mummification process as the eyelids are fused at this gestation. The umbilical cord was preserved to a length of 21 millimetres (0.83 in).

==== CT scanning ====
In late July 2008 CT scanning was conducted as part of the Egyptian Mummy Project. The mummy was found to be in very poor condition, which meant Derry's determination of the sex could not be confirmed. A gestational age of 25 weeks (5–6 months) was estimated from the length of the humerus. The skull was found to be filled with high- and low-density material which may represent brain tissue or embalming material. The torso was also filled with high- and low-density contents which are suggested to be embalming packs, despite the lack of an incision, contrary to Derry's suggestion of preservation by simple desiccation. No deformities were noted, nor could the cause of death be determined.

=== 317b ===
==== Initial examination ====
Derry unwrapped and examined 317b in 1932. This mummy lacked a mask, although its intended mask is likely the one found earlier in Tutankhamun's embalming cache, KV54. The length of the wrapped mummy was 39.5 centimetres (15.6 in) and the length of the body itself was 36.1 centimetres (14.2 in). The manner of wrapping was very similar to the smaller mummy—two triple longitudinal bands and four transverse bands around the head, neck, abdomen and ankles—on top of a shroud. Below the shroud were eleven further layers of pads and bandaging on the feet, legs, abdomen and chest to provide the correct shape. The mummy was noted as not being as well preserved as the smaller mummy, 317a. It was found to also be female and estimated to be seven months' gestation. The skin was the same greyish colour and brittle condition as the younger mummy. Fine hair remained on the back of the head (the rest having come away with the bandages), and eyelashes and eyebrows were present. The eyes were wide open, containing only the shrunken eyeballs. The interior of the skull was examined through the open fontanelle and found to be filled with linen, inserted through the right nostril. The legs were extended and the hands were placed palm down beside the thighs. She likely died at or shortly after birth, as there are indications that the umbilical cord was cut off rather than drying off naturally. A small embalming incision 18 millimetres (0.71 in) long was made parallel to the inguinal ligament to remove the organs. The body cavity was stuffed with linen and the cut was sealed with animal fat.

==== X-rays and serology ====
The mummy was next examined in 1978 using X-rays and was found to have been damaged over the intervening years, with the skull crushed and ribs broken. The age was estimated to be 35 weeks' gestation to full term, and she was diagnosed with Sprengel's deformity, spina bifida, and scoliosis. Serological analysis determined that this mummy had an O blood group. A later re-examination of the X-rays suggested that the child may have been as young as 31 weeks based on the degree of ossification.

==== CT scanning ====
CT scanning was also conducted on this mummy in July 2008 as part of the Egyptian Mummy Project. It was found to be better preserved than 317a and so could be examined more thoroughly. The mummy was confirmed to be female based on the external genitalia and the sub-pubic angle; the age at death was estimated at 37 weeks gestation. The diagnosis of Sprengel's deformity was rejected as, although the left scapula is 6 millimetres (0.24 in) higher than the right, this is due to the left scapula and clavicle being entirely separated from the body and rotating upwards. Both scapulae and clavicles were of normal and comparable dimensions. The spine was found to be in poor condition and fractured postmortem with fragments missing; this gave the appearance of a spine with neural tube defects but no anomalies were found. The scoliosis was determined to be postural. Evidence of padding inserted under the skin, used to restore a life-like appearance, was found in the legs; this has resulted in the left thigh being larger than the right.

== Parentage ==
From the time of their discovery, it has been assumed the two infants were the children of Tutankhamun. Carter considered there to be "little doubt" that they were the children of the king and his only known wife Ankhesenamun. DNA analysis conducted between 2007 and 2009 as part of the Tutankhamun Family Project obtained only partial DNA profiles for 317a and 317b. However, this was enough to conclude that both mummies were the children of Tutankhamun, with probabilities of 99.97992885% and 99.99999299% respectively. Only a partial DNA profile was obtained from the KV21A mummy but it suggests that she was the mother of the two children. However, the results were not statistically significant enough to be confirmed.

Regardless of KV21a's maternity, genetic research suggests that male mummy KV55, who is suggested to be Ankhesenamun's father Ankhenaten, cannot be the two girls's maternal grandfather. Assuming accuracy of obtained data, it could mean that a mother of two princesses was not Ankhesenamun but some unknown Tutankhamun's consort, though there also remain possibilities that Akhenaten was not Ankhesenamun's biological father, or that KV55 male is not Akhenaten altogether.

== Circumstances of deaths and burial ==
The causes and circumstances of their deaths are unknown. Carter attributed their deaths to natural causes (such as a miscarriage) but indulged in speculation that the miscarriages may have been orchestrated as "an accident to the expectant mother would have rendered the throne vacant for those eager to step in."

Carter considered them to be the result of two separate pregnancies but the burial of 317a and 317b within Tutankhamun's tomb has led to speculation that they died around the same time as him, or at least prior to his burial. In order to explain two babies of different sizes resulting from a single pregnancy, it has been suggested that the two were identical twins with twin-to-twin transfusion syndrome, resulting in one twin who was large for its gestational age and one who was much smaller. Although this diagnosis cannot be proven or disproven by CT analysis, it is considered a "remote possibility" by Hawass and Saleem. However, as Charlier and colleagues pointed out in a response, the different DNA probabilities between 317a and 317b is enough to rule out the identical twin theory, which Hawass and Saleem agree with. Alternatively, the pair are theorized to be fraternal twins which died in utero, with 317a dying first and partially calcifying (lithopedion), before 317b died weeks later. This is refuted, as 317a does not show any of the obvious signs exhibited by lithopedion, and the poor condition of both is due to improper storage after their unwrapping.

Regardless of their cause of death, the burial of royal children with their fathers is not unprecedented in the Eighteenth Dynasty, with Webensenu being buried in his father Amenhotep II's tomb, and Amenemhat, Tentamun, and another unnamed child buried with Thutmose IV; all had seemingly predeceased their fathers.

Before genetic analysis was performed, Christiane Desroches Noblecourt suggested that the infants were not related to Tutankhamun and their burial in his tomb was part of a ritual to ensure his rebirth into the afterlife. While claim about the children being unrelated to the Pharaoh was since debunked, Joyce Tyldesley believes that the joint burial of Tutankhamun and his two daughters could indeed have symbolic meaning of two princesses protecting and supporting their father in the afterlife.

== See also ==
- Eighteenth Dynasty of Egypt family tree
