= Donald P. Ryan =

Donald P. Ryan (born 1957) is an American archaeologist, Egyptologist, writer and a member of the Division of Humanities at Pacific Lutheran University in Tacoma, Washington. His areas of research interest include Egyptian archaeology, Polynesian archaeology, the history of archaeology, the history of exploration, ancient languages and scripts, and experimental archaeology. He is best known for his research in Egypt including excavations in the Valley of the Kings where he investigated the long-neglected undecorated tombs in the royal cemetery. His work there resulted in the rediscovery of the lost and controversial tomb KV60, the re-opening of the long-buried KV21 with its two female and likely royal occupants, and the re-excavation of tombs KV27, KV28, KV44, KV45, KV48, KV49 along with work in KV20. In 2017, he rediscovered three small tombs (KV50, KV51 and KV52) in the Valley of the Kings which when first encountered in 1906 contained the mummies of animals including a dog and monkeys.

Between 1995 and 2002, Ryan worked closely with the Norwegian explorer, archaeologist and writer Thor Heyerdahl (1914-2002). Among their many projects, the two directed excavations at the site of the Pyramids of Güímar on Tenerife in the Canary Islands. Ryan has been entrusted with continuing some of the research aspects of Heyerdahl’s legacy. He was a major contributor to Thor Heyerdahl's Kon-Tiki in New Light and wrote the introduction to the new Norwegian edition of Heyerdahl's Kon-Tiki.

Other research by Ryan includes investigations of ancient Egyptian cordage and other technologies, studies of inscribed Egyptian funerary cones, biographical studies of early archaeologists including Giovanni Belzoni, studies of the influence of antiquity on culture and the arts, and the documentation of petroglyphs on the island of Hawaii.

As a writer and researcher, Ryan is the author of numerous scientific and popular articles on archaeological subjects. His books include volumes in the popular Complete Idiot’s Guide Series (Lost Civilizations, Biblical Mysteries, Ancient Egypt and World of the Bible), A Shattered Visage Lies...Nineteenth Century Poetry Inspired By Ancient Egypt, Ancient Egypt on Five Deben a Day, Ancient Egypt: The Basics, Ancient Egypt in Verse,24 Hours in Ancient Egypt, A Year in the Life of Ancient Egypt, and a memoir, Beneath the Sands of Egypt. His television credits include work with the BBC, Discovery Channel, National Geographic, A&E, the Learning Channel, and others.

Ryan is a Fellow of The Explorers Club and the Royal Geographical Society, a Research Associate of the Kon-Tiki Museum, a founding member of the Scientific Committee of the Foundation for Exploration and Research on Cultural Origins, a mountaineering instructor, endurance athlete, and pianist.
