= KV21 =

Ancient Egyptian tomb in the Valley of the Kings

- Burial site of two female mummies
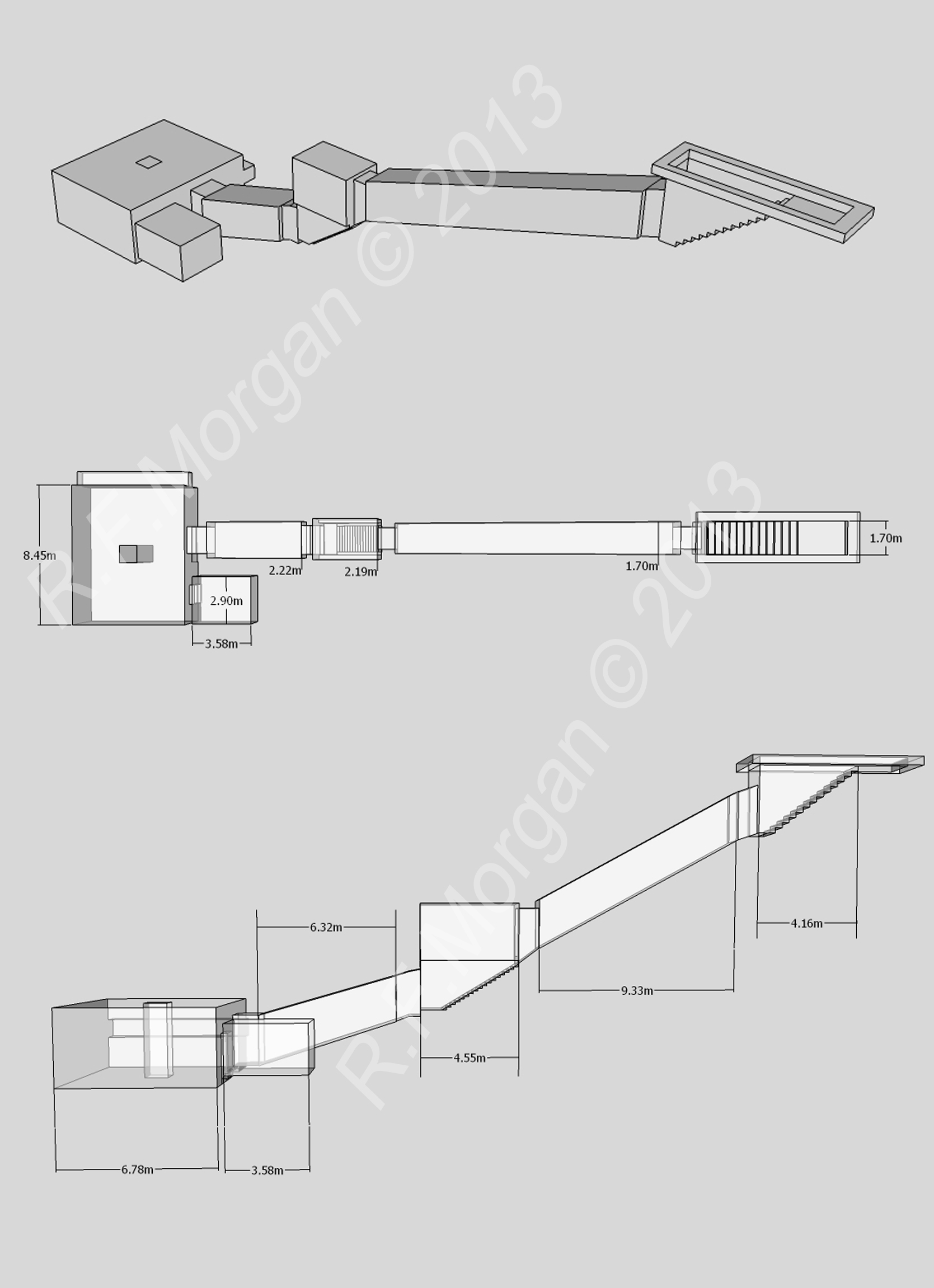
- KV21 schematic

- Location within Egypt
- Coordinates: 25°44′22.5″N 32°36′10.8″E
- Location: East Valley of the Kings
- Discovered: 9 October 1817
- Excavated by: Giovanni Belzoni (1817); James Burton (mapped, 1825); Donald P. Ryan (1989)
- Layout: Straight axis
- ← Previous; KV20 Next → WV22

Tomb KV21 is an ancient Egyptian tomb located in the Valley of the Kings in Egypt. It was discovered in 1817 by Giovanni Belzoni and later re-excavated by Donald P. Ryan in 1989. It contains the mummies of two women, thought to be Eighteenth Dynasty queens. In 2010, a team headed by Zahi Hawass used DNA evidence to tentatively identify one mummy, KV21A, as the biological mother of the two infants buried in the tomb of King Tutankhamun.

== Architecture ==
The tomb consists of a sloping descending passageway, a staircase, and another descending passage. The passage ends in a room with a single central column and a small chamber adjoining it. The walls are well cut and ready to receive plaster if plastering was intended. The tomb is most similar in layout scale to KV32, the tomb of Tiaa, mother of Thutmose IV. Marc Gabolde considers that the more precise cutting and regular layout of this tomb date it to slightly later than KV32.

== Discovery and contents ==
The tomb was discovered by Giovanni Belzoni in 1817. He found a brick wall at the end of the first section of passageway; it had been broken through in antiquity. In the larger room Belzoni found two naked female mummies with long hair; he notes how easily the hair of one of the mummies pulled out when he tugged at it. The smaller chamber contained pottery and alabaster sherds. A complete large ceramic jar was found at the top of the stairs.

James Burton, who mapped it in 1825, called it a "clean new tomb – the water not having got into it."

=== Re-investigation ===
The tomb was re-investigated in 1989 by Donald Ryan as part of the Pacific Lutheran University Valley of the Kings Project. He found the entrance buried under flood debris; water had penetrated the tomb as evidenced by the "tide-line" on the wall of the burial chamber which indicated it had been filled with several inches of water. The once well-preserved mummies were found in scattered pieces, the white-washed jars in the side chamber had been smashed with large rocks, and a large graffito on one of the tombs walls proclaimed "ME 1826." The presence of bat guano indicated that the tomb had been open for some time after Belzoni and Burton had visited.

In 1993 a crack monitor was installed; no or minimal movement was detected. The small finds from the tomb were analysed by the Project in 2005 and were able to group them into three categories: those that dated to the Eighteenth Dynasty; those that suggested the tomb was reused in the Third Intermediate Period; and strays washed in, one of which was an ushabti for a Ramesside pharaoh. Though a small amount of water had penetrated the tomb during the 1994 floods, the packed contents were secure and dry; objects from KV44 and KV45 were moved to this tomb for flood protection.

== Mummies ==
Ryan's re-excavation of the tomb found that the two female mummies had been badly damaged some time after the initial report by Belzoni. The head and torso of one mummy was found in the first corridor. Other pieces were scattered on the stairs, but the majority of the remains were still in the burial chamber; a pile of snapped-off hands and feet were located here. The head of one mummy was missing, Ryan suggests that it was taken as a souvenir. Mark Papworth gave a preliminary description of both mummies some time after Ryan had collected them. CT scanning and DNA analysis was conducted on both mummies in the 2010s.

=== KV21A ===
This mummy is headless and poorly preserved. The back half of the torso is present and the abdominal cavity contains linen embalming packs and stones. The left shoulder and arm are missing; the left hand associated with the body is clenched, indicating the 'queenly' pose. Sections of the spine are missing. Both legs are present but are no longer articulated with the body. The left and right feet are severely clubbed. In his earlier report, Mark Papworth suggests this is due to soaking and compression of the body by debris during flood events. Her height in life is estimated at approximately 148 cm (4 ft 10 1/2 in) and her age is estimated to be no older than 21 based on the degree of epiphyseal union.

The results of the DNA analysis announced in 2010 suggests that this mummy is the mother of the two mummified infants from the tomb of Tutankhamun, but not enough data was obtained to make a definitive identification. Hawass suggests this mummy may be Ankhesenamun, the Great Royal Wife of Tutankhamun, and daughter of Nefertiti.

Additionally, genetic research suggests that KV55 male who is presumed to be Akhenaten (Ankhesenamun's father), cannot be maternal grandfather of Tutankhamun's children, therefore KV21a cannot be his daughter. According Belmonte the most likely explenation is that KV55 mummy does not belong to Akhenaten but to Smenkhkare, or alternatively, Tutankhamun fathered his daughters by different woman than Ankhesenamun. It was also proposed that KV55 is Akhenaten and KV21a is Ankhesenamun, but Akhenaten was not her biological father as result of Nefertiti's extramarital affair, which Juan Belmonte notes as "historical speculation, possible but improbable".

Alternatively, Marc Gabolde suggests a different interpretation of the DNA results and proposes KV21a to be Mutemwiya, mother of Amenhotep III (and great-great-grandmother of Tutankhamun's daughters, instead of their mother). However, such scenario is according to Belmonte of "low probability".

=== KV21B ===
This mummy was found in the upper corridor. The upper frontal part of the skull is missing but her left eye socket remains. The teeth that are present show moderate wear. Dark hair is present on the nape of the neck. Much of the chest wall is missing; the torso contains linen embalming packs. The left arm is broken but was once flexed across the chest in the 'queenly' pose; the left hand is clenched. Degenerative changes to the spine are present across multiple vertebrae. Most of both legs are present, but the front parts of both feet are missing. Her height in life is estimated to be approximately 151 cm (4 ft 11 1/2 in) while her age is estimated at 45 years based on degenerative bone changes.

DNA analysis did not yield enough data to make a firm identification but tied her to the late Eighteenth Dynasty royal line. Hawass considers this mummy is a candidate for the body of Nefertiti; this is based on her association with the possible body of Ankhesenamun. It is now known that in KV35, a mother (Tiye) was found lying next to her daughter (the Younger Lady); it is possible the same relationship exists between these mummies.
