= KV43 =

Tomb of Pharaoh Thutmose IV

- Burial site of Thutmose IV
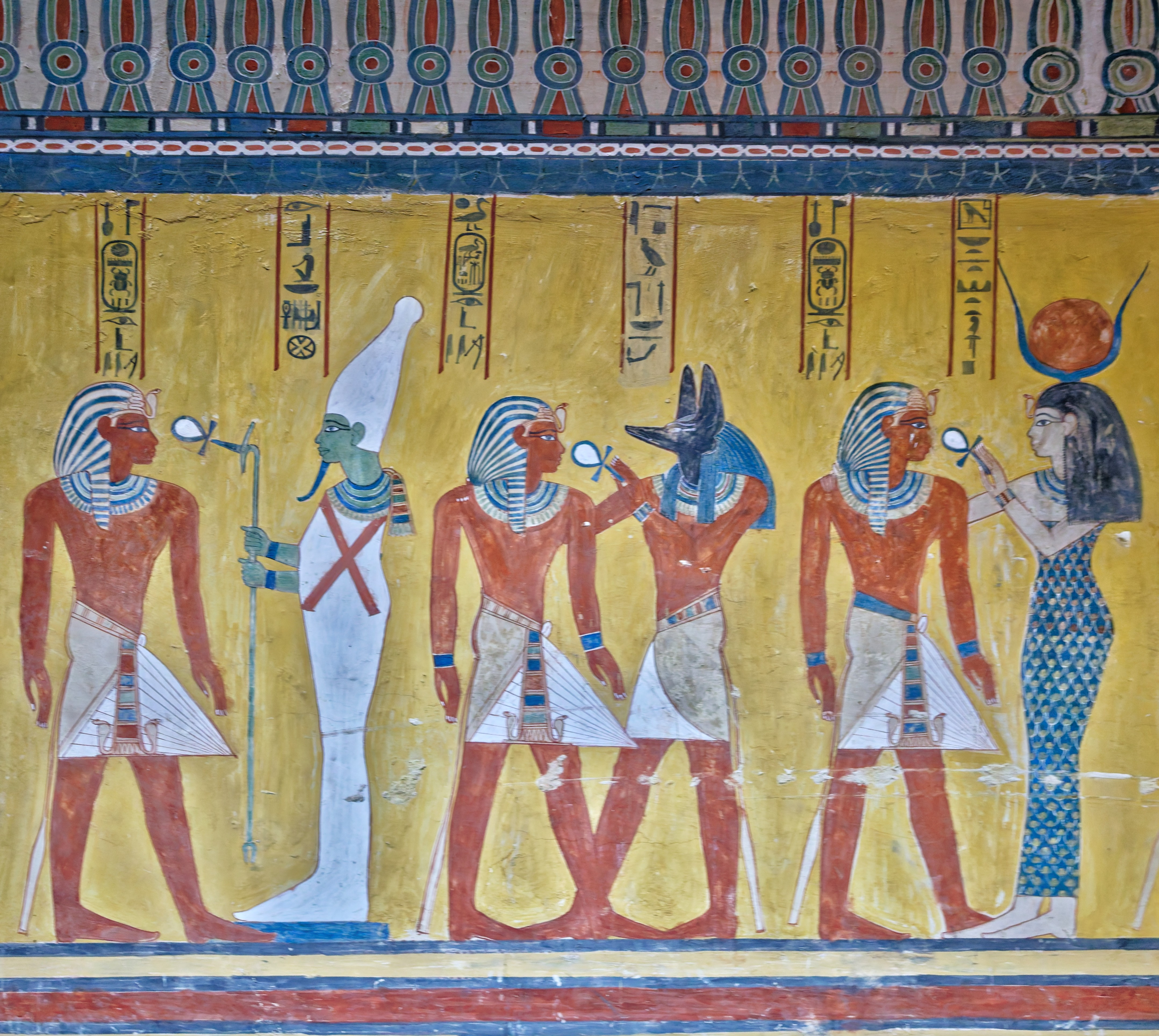
- Thutmose receives life from, in turn, Osiris, Anubis, and Hathor (wall decoration in KV43)

- Location within Egypt
- Coordinates: 25°44′19.2″N 32°36′11.1″E
- Location: East Valley of the Kings
- Discovered: January 1903
- Excavated by: Howard Carter
- Decoration: Thutmose before Osiris, Anubis, and Hathor
- Layout: Bent to the left
- ← Previous; KV42 Next → KV44

Tomb KV43 is the burial place of Thutmose IV, a pharaoh of the Eighteenth Dynasty in the Valley of the Kings in Luxor, Egypt. He was interred with two of his children who predeceased him. The tomb has a dog-leg shape, typical of the layout of early Eighteenth dynasty tombs. KV43 was rediscovered in 1903 by Howard Carter, excavating on behalf of Theodore M. Davis. The tomb lacks Thutmose's mummy, which was found in 1898 in KV35, where many royal coffins were moved in ancient times.

== History ==
=== Burial and restoration ===
Thutmose IV ruled as pharaoh during the mid-Eighteenth Dynasty of the New Kingdom of Ancient Egypt. He was interred in tomb KV43 in the Valley of the Kings with two of his children who died before him, Prince Amenemhat and Princess Tentamun.

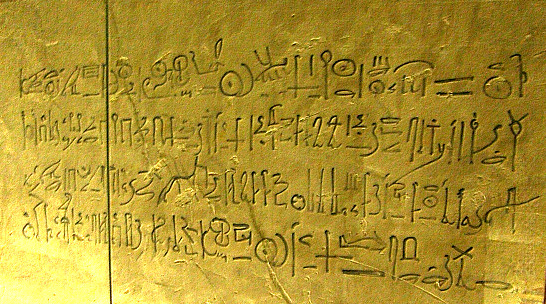
Large hieratic graffito recording the inspection of the tomb by Maya

By the reign of Horemheb at the end of the Eighteenth Dynasty, the tomb had been entered and robbed. Its restoration is recorded in two hieratic inscriptions are written in black on the right-hand wall of the antechamber. The first, larger inscription is as follows:

Year 8, 3rd month of akhet-season, day 1, under the majesty of the King of Upper and Lower Egypt, Djeserkheperure-setepenre, son of Re Horemheb-merenamun. His majesty life! prosperity! health! commanded that the fan-bearer on the king's right hand, the king's scribe, overseer of the treasury, overseer of works in the Place of Eternity [i.e. the royal necropolis] and leader of the festival of Amun in Karnak, Maya, son of the noble Iawy, born of the lady of the house Weret, be charged to renew the burial of King Menkheperure, true of voice, in the noble mansion upon the west of Thebes.

The second inscription, to the right and slightly higher than the large one, is much shorter:

His assistant, the steward of the southern city, Djehutymose, whose mother is Iniuhe of the city [i.e. Thebes].

The larger inscription refers to Maya in the second person, and incorrectly names his mother as Weret, making it unlikely that he was the author of the inscription. The handwriting of the two graffiti are identical, and it is known that the restoration of Tutankhamun's tomb was also carried out by Djehutymose as he left a graffito there too. Therefore, Maya likely delegated the task of inspecting and restoring the tomb to his subordinate, Djehutymose.

=== Discovery and excavation ===
This tomb was discovered in January 1903 by Howard Carter as part of the systematic clearance of a small valley that runs west from the tomb of Ramesses III (KV3). These excavations were conducted by the Antiquities Service on behalf of Theodore Davis. An alabaster vase inscribed with the name of Thutmose IV had been encountered part way up the valley in 1902, leading Carter to suspect he was close to the tomb. By January 1903, investigations reached the base of a sheer cliff; here the bedrock rises to form a natural platform which was leveled to take the tomb cutting. On this platform, in front of the tomb entrance, two intact foundation deposits were uncovered containing alabaster vessels and model implements; one of them, an alabaster saucer, had been usurped from Hatshepsut. The discovery of these items, along with others also bearing the king's name, confirmed this was the tomb of Thutmose IV. On 18 January 1903 the entrance was cleared enough to permit an exploration; Davis had already left for Aswan, and Carter, unable to contact him, resolved to enter the tomb anyway, inviting American amateur Egyptologist Robb de Peyster Tytus along for the inspection.

The tomb had been thoroughly robbed in antiquity, and Carter found the entrance passage partly filled with debris and broken artefacts. The blocked and painted doorway leading to the first pillared hall had been penetrated by robbers. More tangible evidence of their presence was encountered in the hall: a rope made of palm fiber was still secured around one of the columns, with its end reaching the bottom of the well shaft. Evidence of double-sealing was encountered in the antechamber; seals bearing the name of Horemheb occurred in addition to the original "jackal over captives" necropolis seal on a partially blocked doorway.

== Architecture ==
Tomb layout of KV43 A – Entrance B – Corridor C – Steps D – Corridor E – Well shaft F – First pillared hall G – Steep corridor H – Steps I – Antechamber J – Burial chamber Ja–Jd – Storerooms

The tomb follows on from the design and layout of KV35, the tomb of Thutmose IV's father Amenhotep II, but is more precise in its cutting and alignment. The first three corridors end in a deep well with a chamber at the bottom. This chamber was likely intended to throw off tomb robbers. Past the well leads to the first pillared hall, and thus the rest of the tomb.

The axis then turns 90 degrees within the first pillared hall which leads, with stairs and a sloping corridor, to the antechamber and burial chamber. In a departure from KV35, the far end of the burial chamber is lowered to form a "crypt" for the sarcophagus. An innovative feature of this tomb is the presence of magical niches, which are seen in all later 18th Dynasty and early 19th Dynasty tombs. Four storerooms are arranged symmetrically on either side of the burial chamber.

== Contents ==
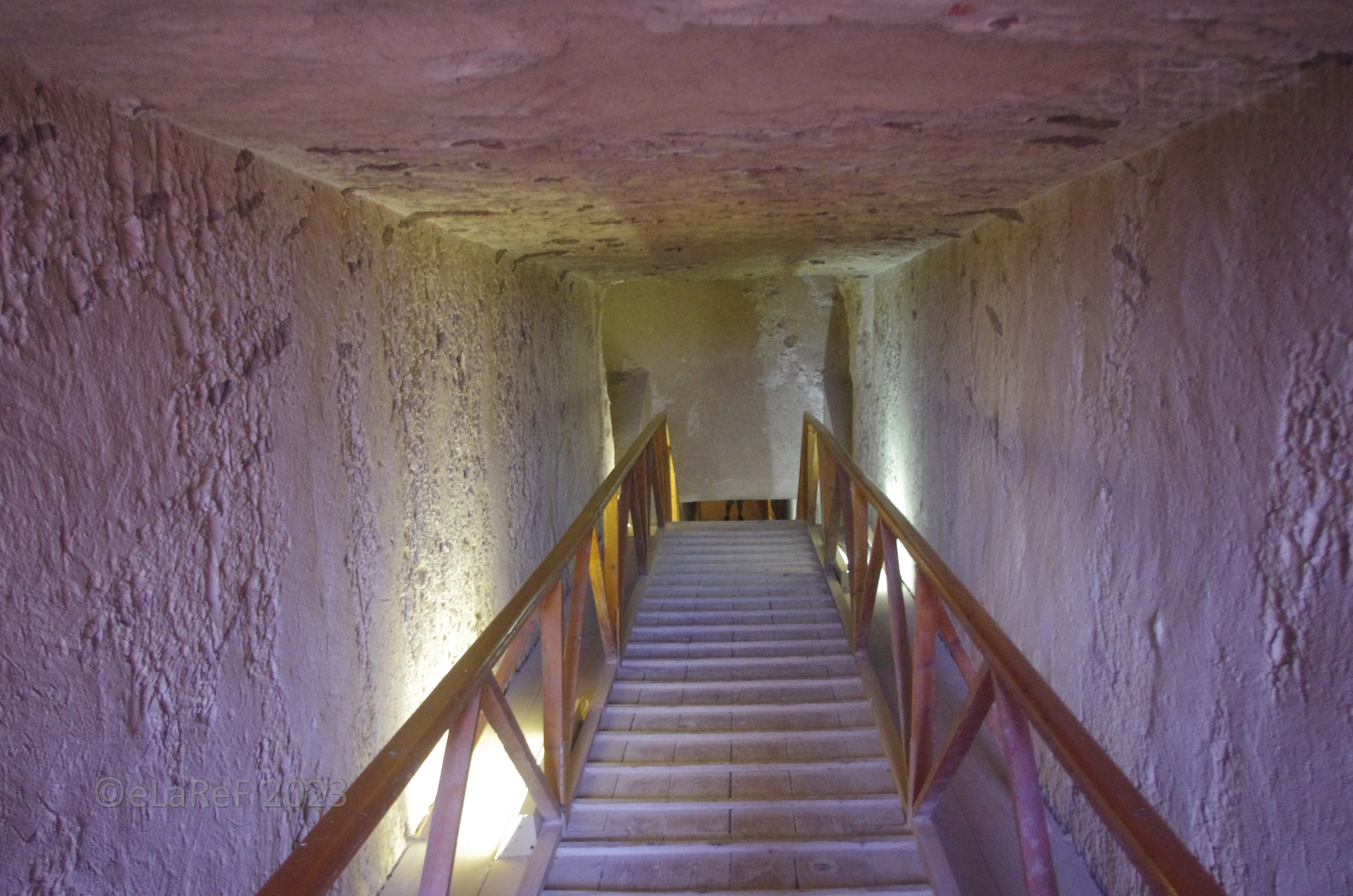
The steep tomb corridor of KV43

The pharaoh's red stone sarcophagus, covered in yellow-filled text and figures, was still in place in the burial chamber. Its lid was propped up beside it, supported by slabs of stone and the sculpted wooden head of a cow. The sarcophagus and lid have a rounded head end and a square foot end. Nephthys, with arms raised, is on the head end, while Isis, in the same attitude, is at the feet. The sides depict the king with Anubis, accompanied by text. The sarcophagus only contained two wooden figures as the king's mummy had been found five years earlier among the royal mummies cached in KV35. The burial chamber also contained the body of a chariot, once covered in silver leaf, and decorated with scenes of the king slaying enemies, an archer's gauntlet made of red and green leather, parts of a colourful tapestry-woven garment with the name of Amenhotep II, black-painted statuettes of the king, fragments of stone vases, broken fan handles, and portions of a cedar wood throne.

Inspection of the side chambers yielded varying results: Chamber Ja only contained a mass of linen wrappings from a mummy; Chamber Jb contained victual mummies of meat and birds; Chamber Jc contained broken jars and large quantities of grain; Chamber Jd contained masses of broken faience vessels and shabti, along with the unwrapped mummy of a young boy propped up against the wall. This boy is likely Prince Amenemhat, whose canopic jars were found in the tomb. Canopic jars of a Princess Tentamun were also found, indicating that she was once interred in her father's tomb. No trace of blocking or sealing was found at the entrances of these chambers so they were likely closed with wooden doors, long since looted, as evidenced by sockets, and a wooden lintel on Chamber Ja.

== Decoration ==
Due to the untimely death of Thutmose IV, only two rooms in this tomb were decorated: the upper part of the well shaft, and the antechamber. The ceilings of both areas are decorated with yellow stars on a blue background. In the case of the well, only two walls are fully decorated: they begin with a kheker-frieze and the left wall depicts Thutmose before Osiris, Anubis, and Hathor. The other wall is unfinished and depicts Anubis. In the antechamber likewise only two walls are painted and have the same repeating decorative scheme of the king depicted before various gods. At some time in the late twentieth century, an unsuccessful attempt was made to cut out the head portrait of one of the figures of Hathor on the east wall. The damage is still visible today.

== Gallery ==
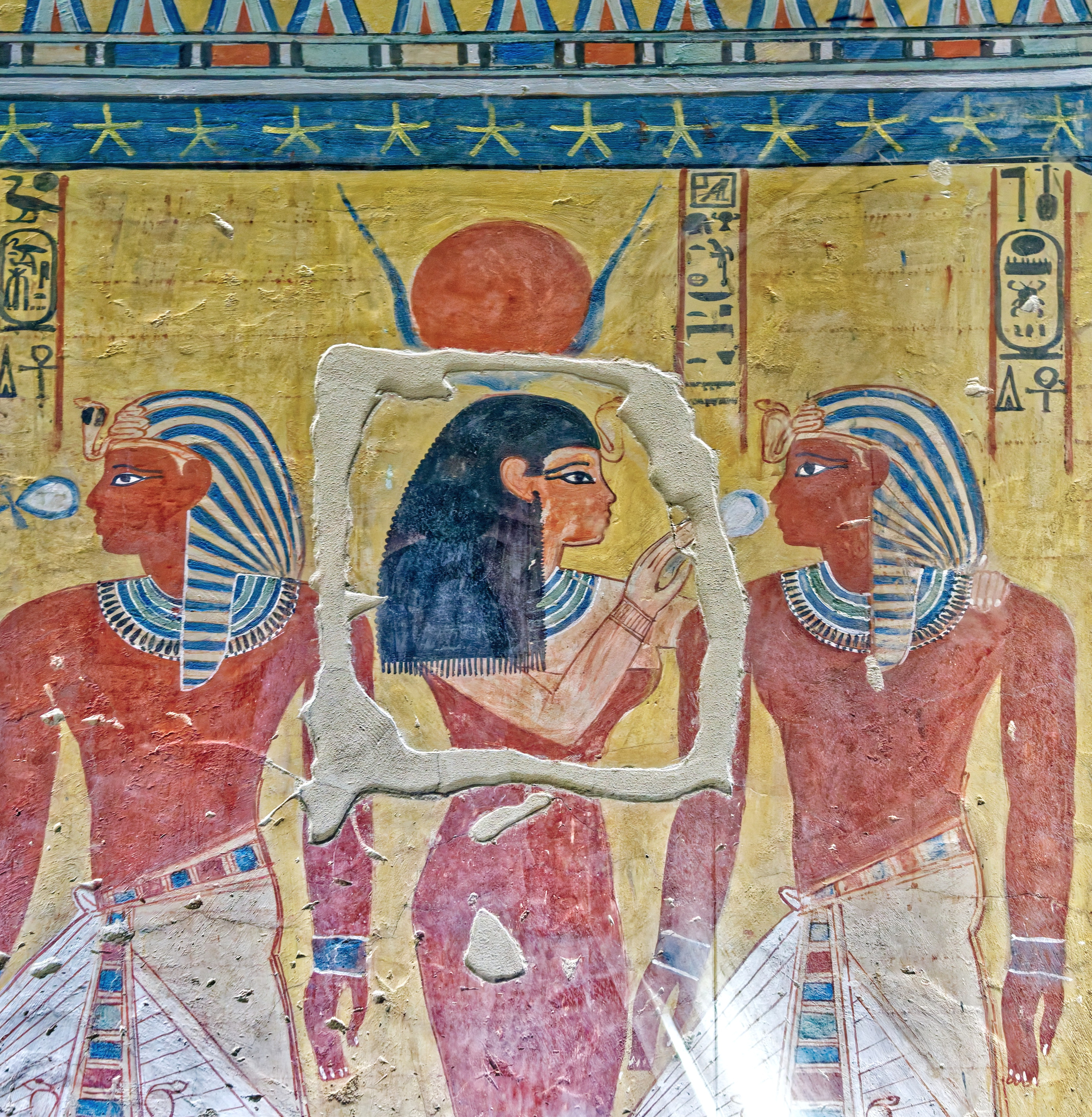
Damage from an unsuccessful attempt to cut out the head of one of the figures of Hathor on the east wall.

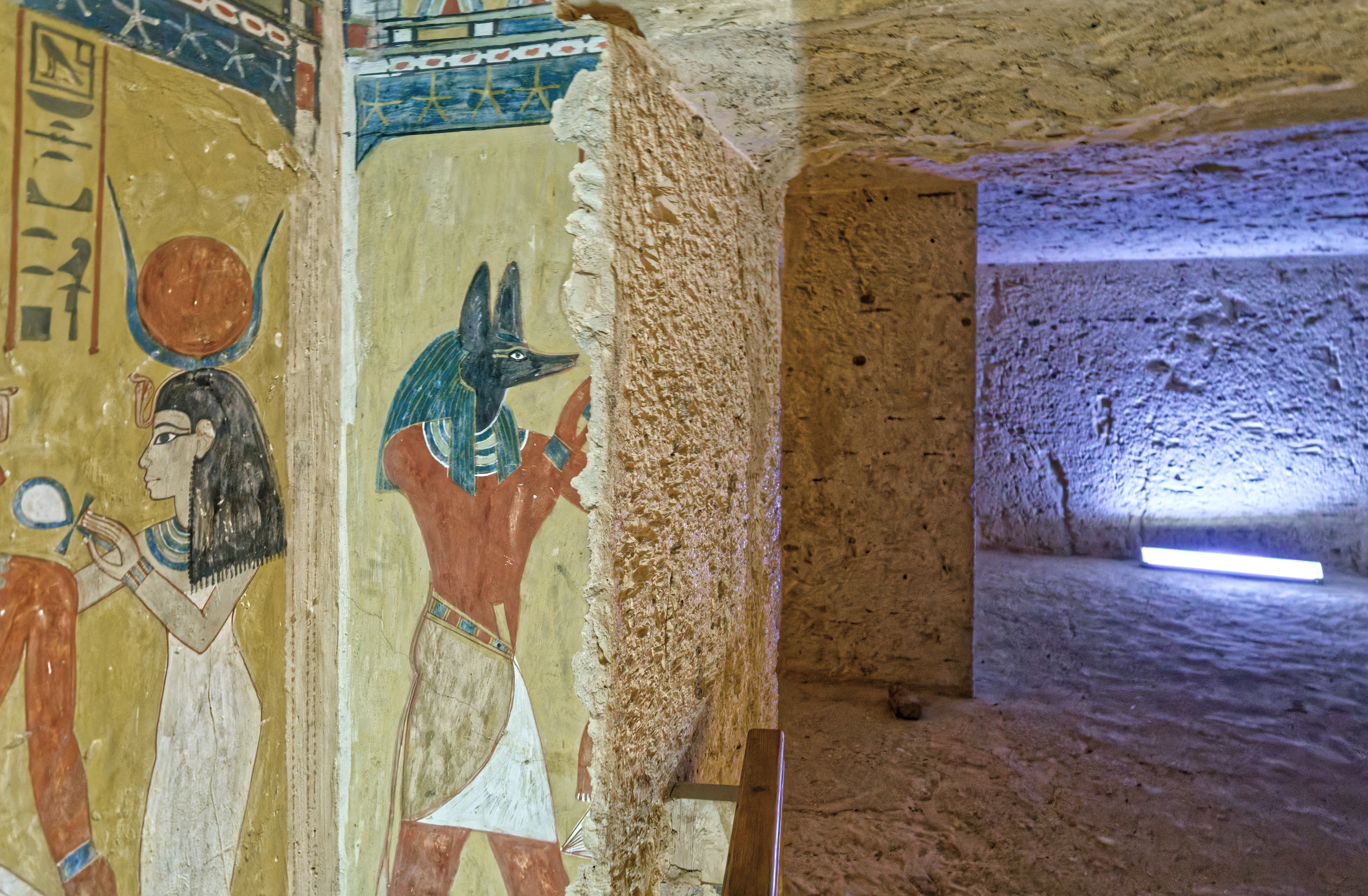
Partial decoration on the partition wall that was damaged in antiquity by the priests of Amun in order to retrieve the mummy.

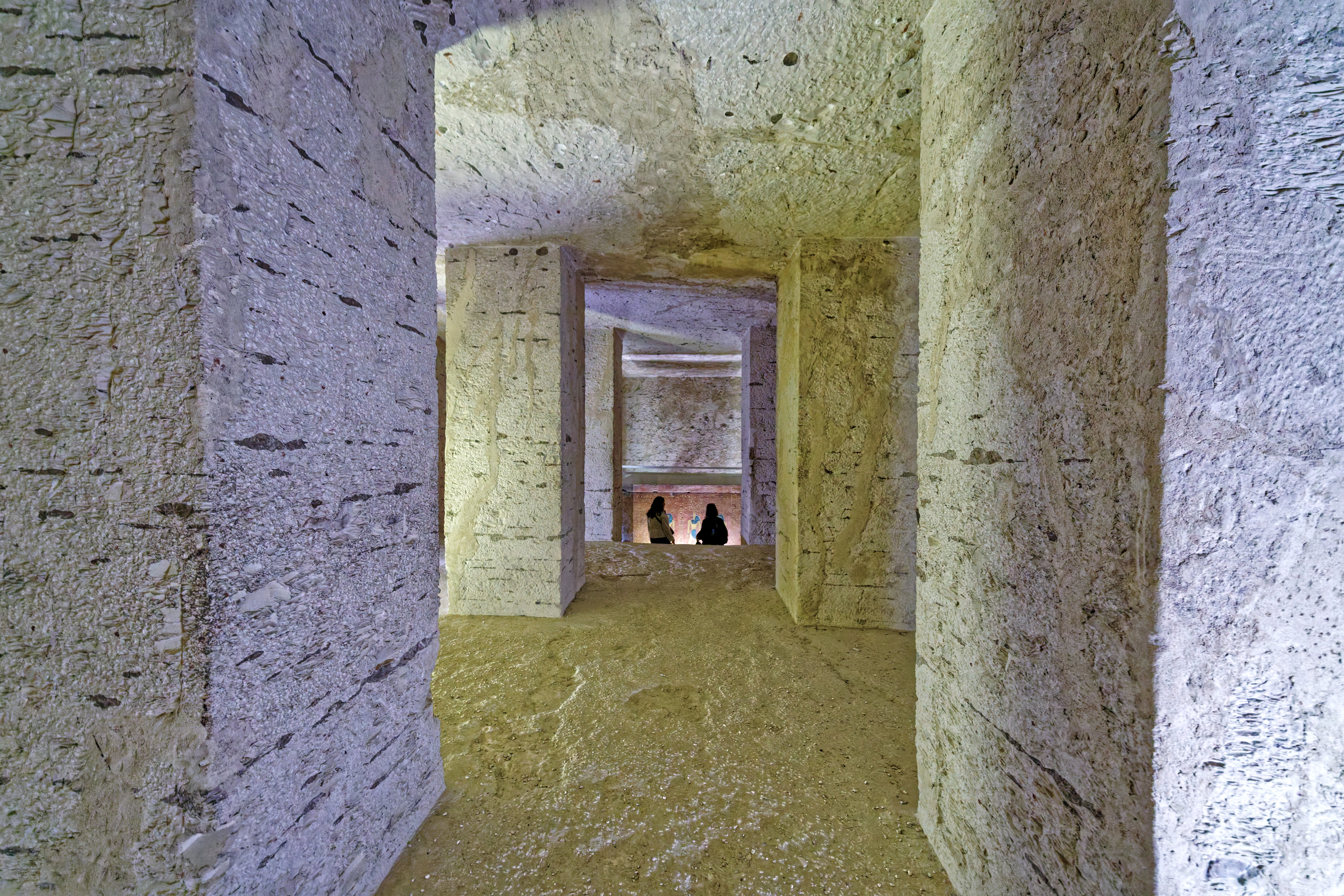
Undecorated part of the tomb leading to the burial chamber

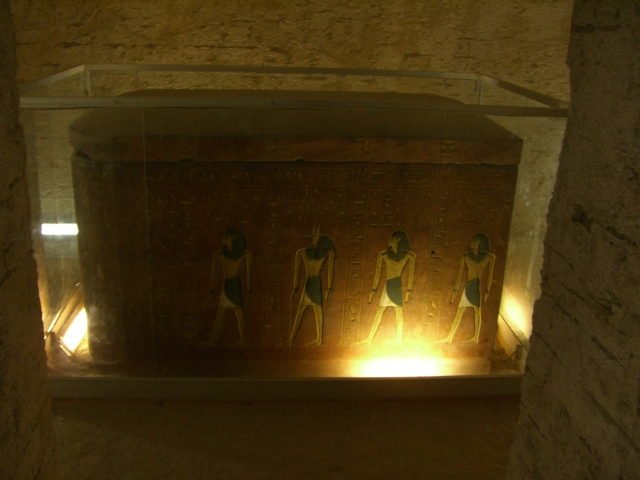
The sarcophagus in the burial chamber

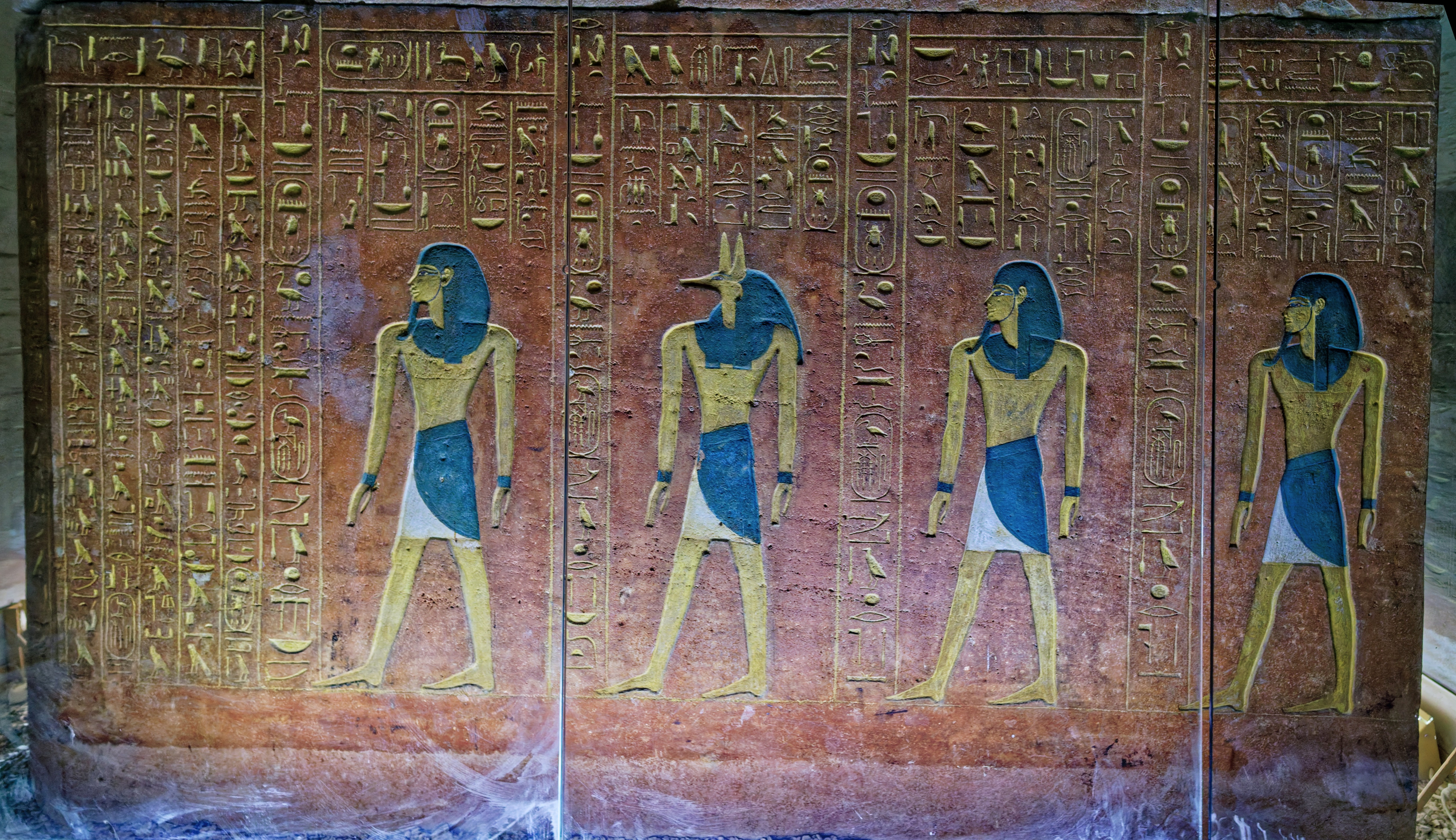
Detail of the sarcophagus in the burial chamber

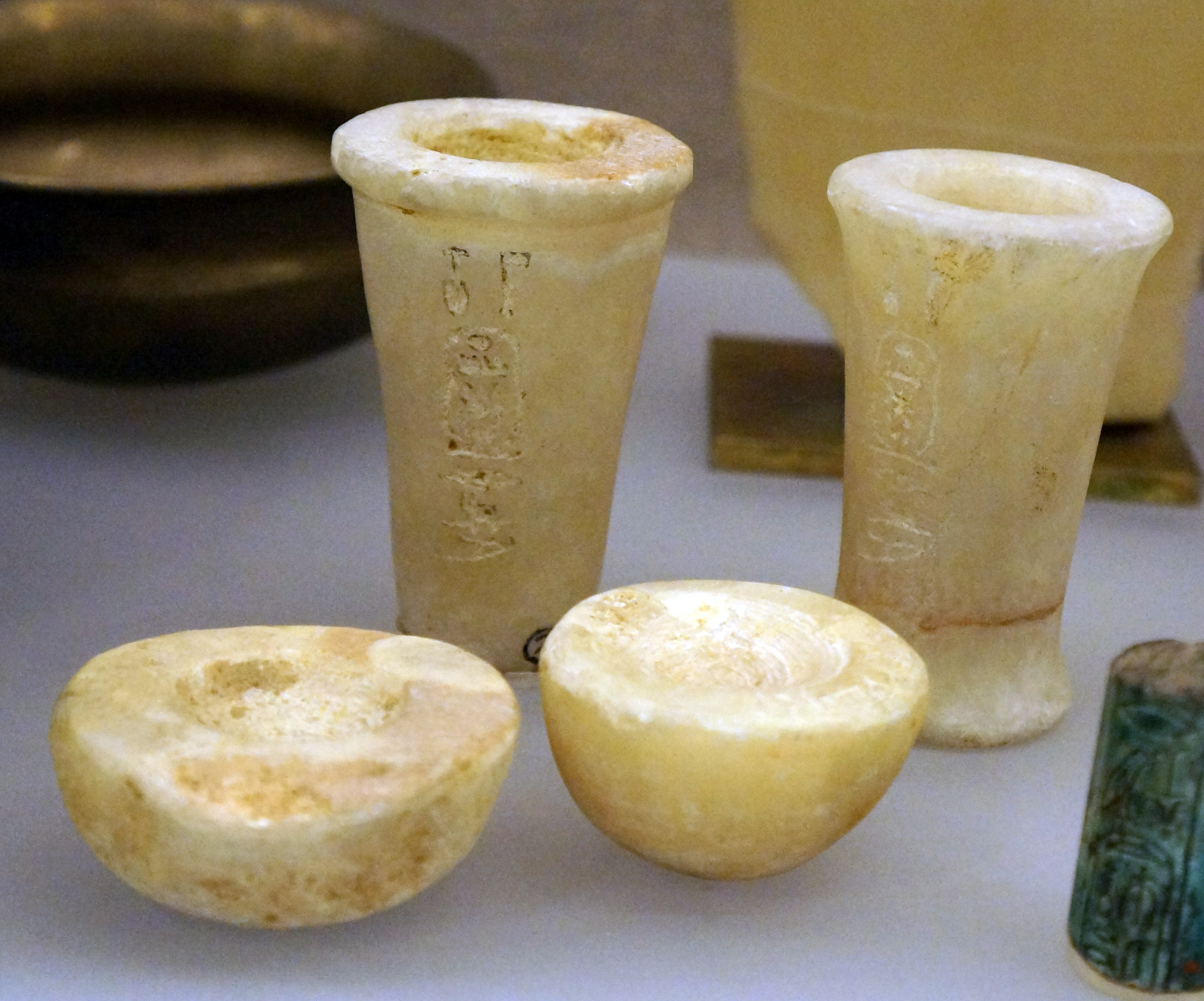
Model alabaster vases from one of the foundation deposits

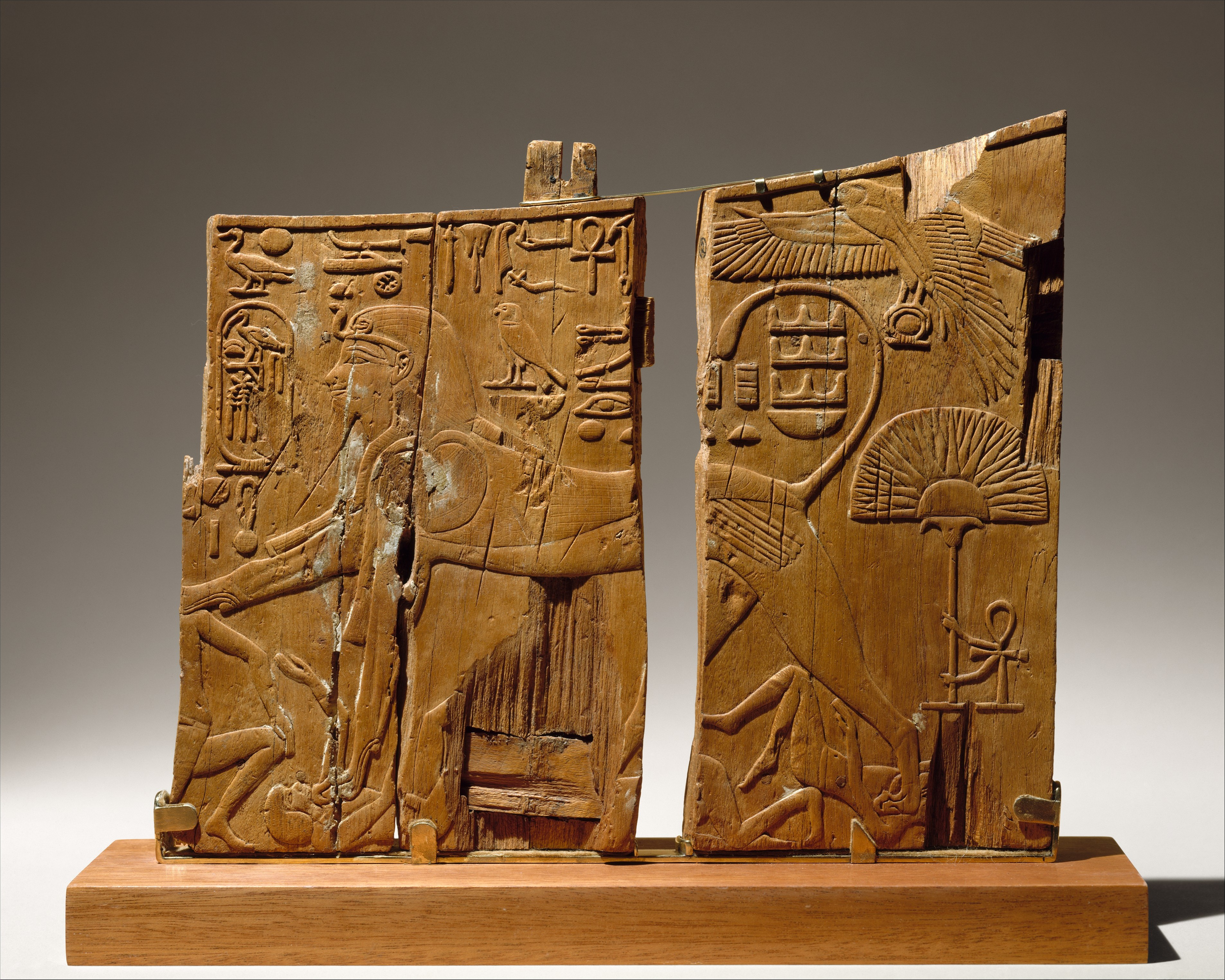
Arm panel from a ceremonial chair of Thutmose IV depicting the king as a sphinx trampling enemies, now in the Metropolitan Museum of Art

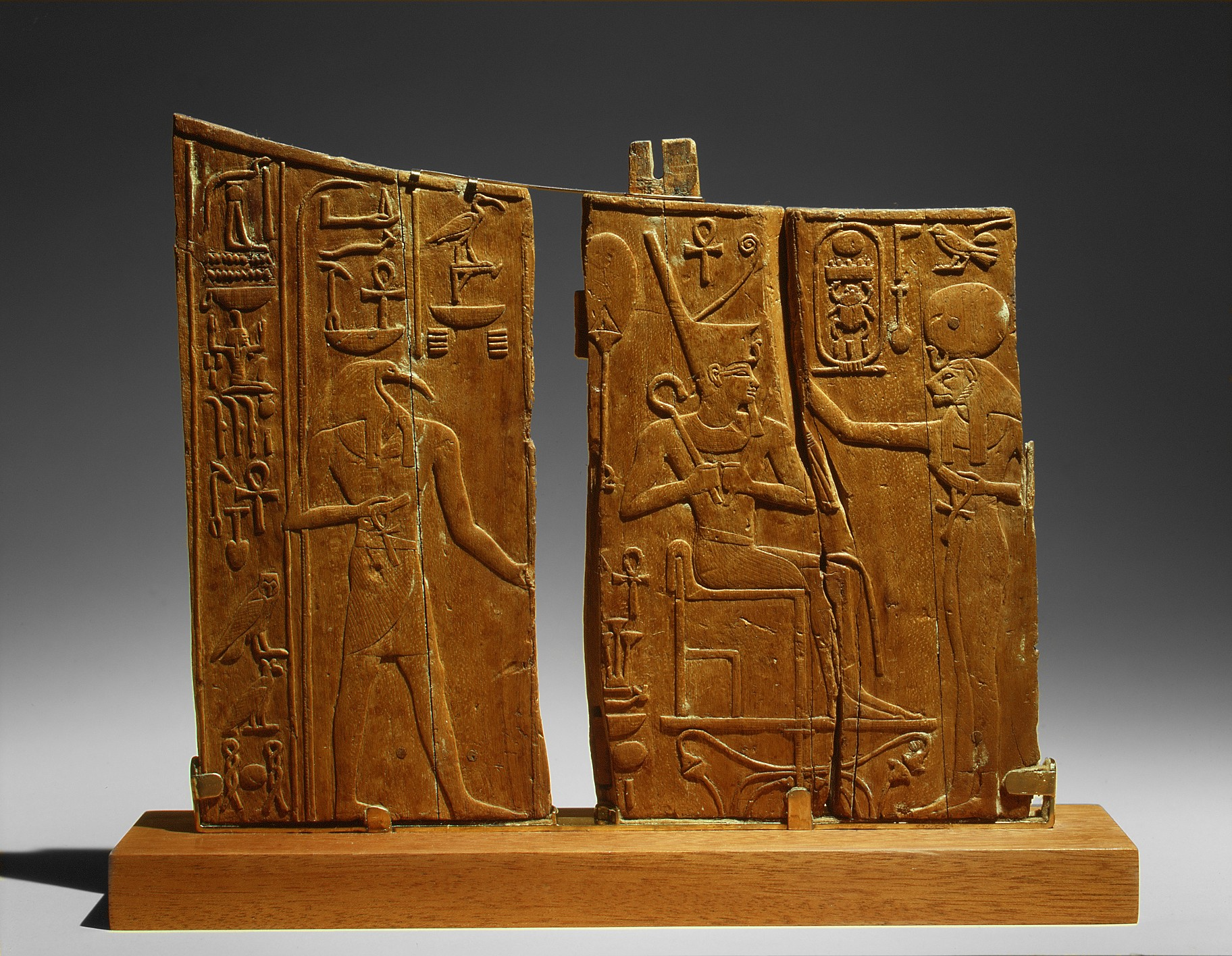
Arm panel from a ceremonial chair of Thutmose IV depicting the king seated with Thoth and a lioness-headed goddess, now in the Metropolitan Museum of Art

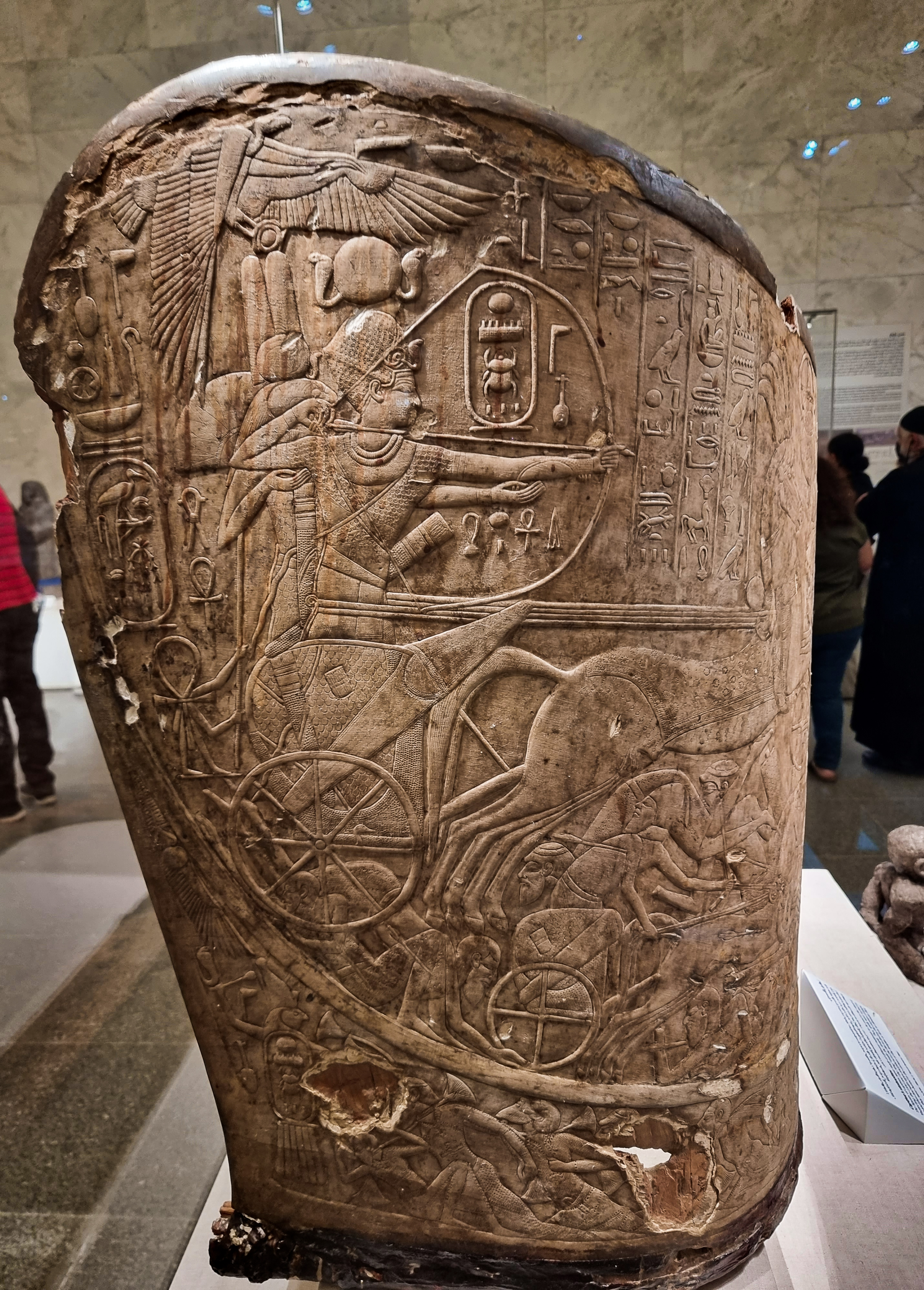
Chariot of Thutmose IV

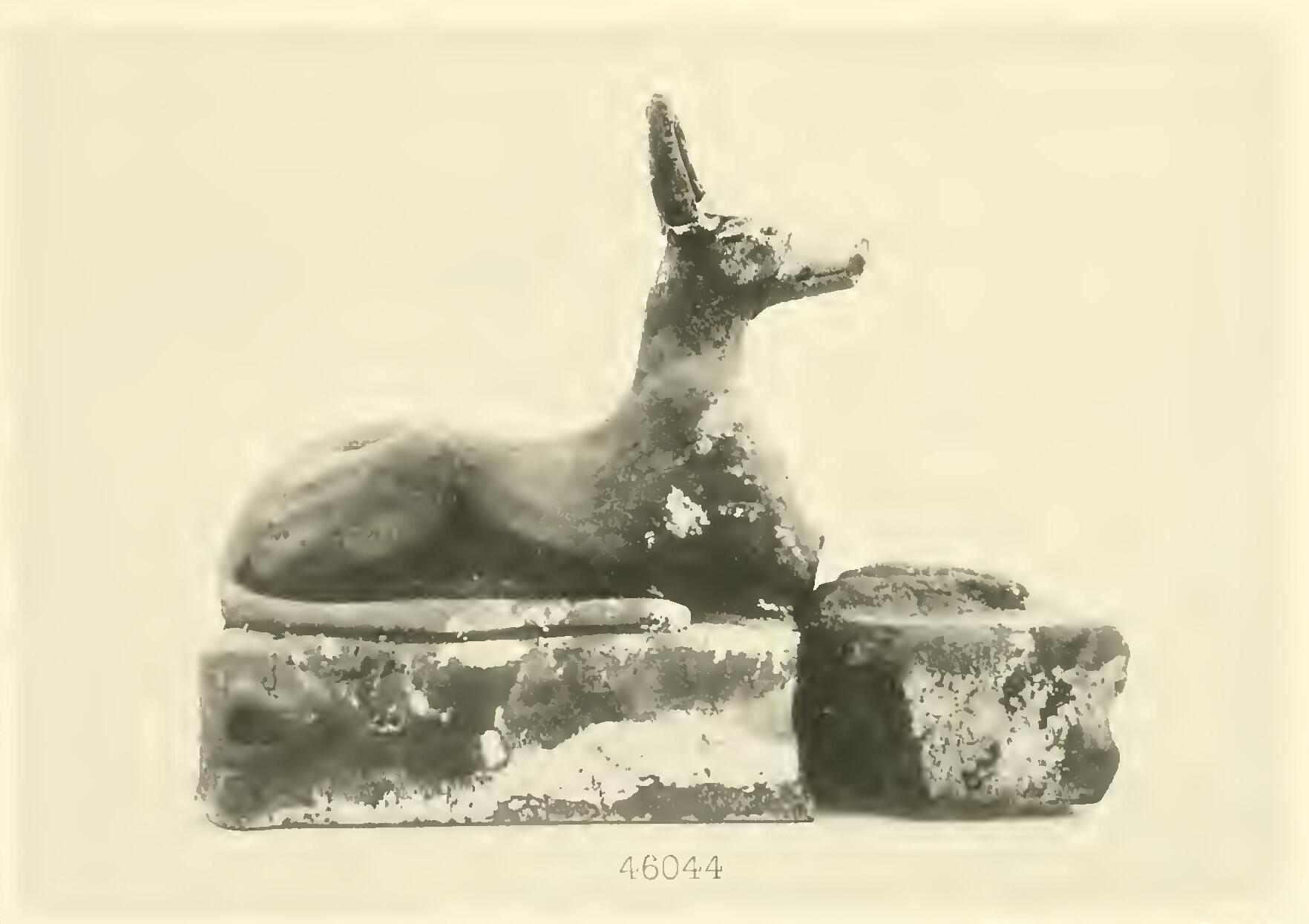
Thutmose IV's Anubis statue

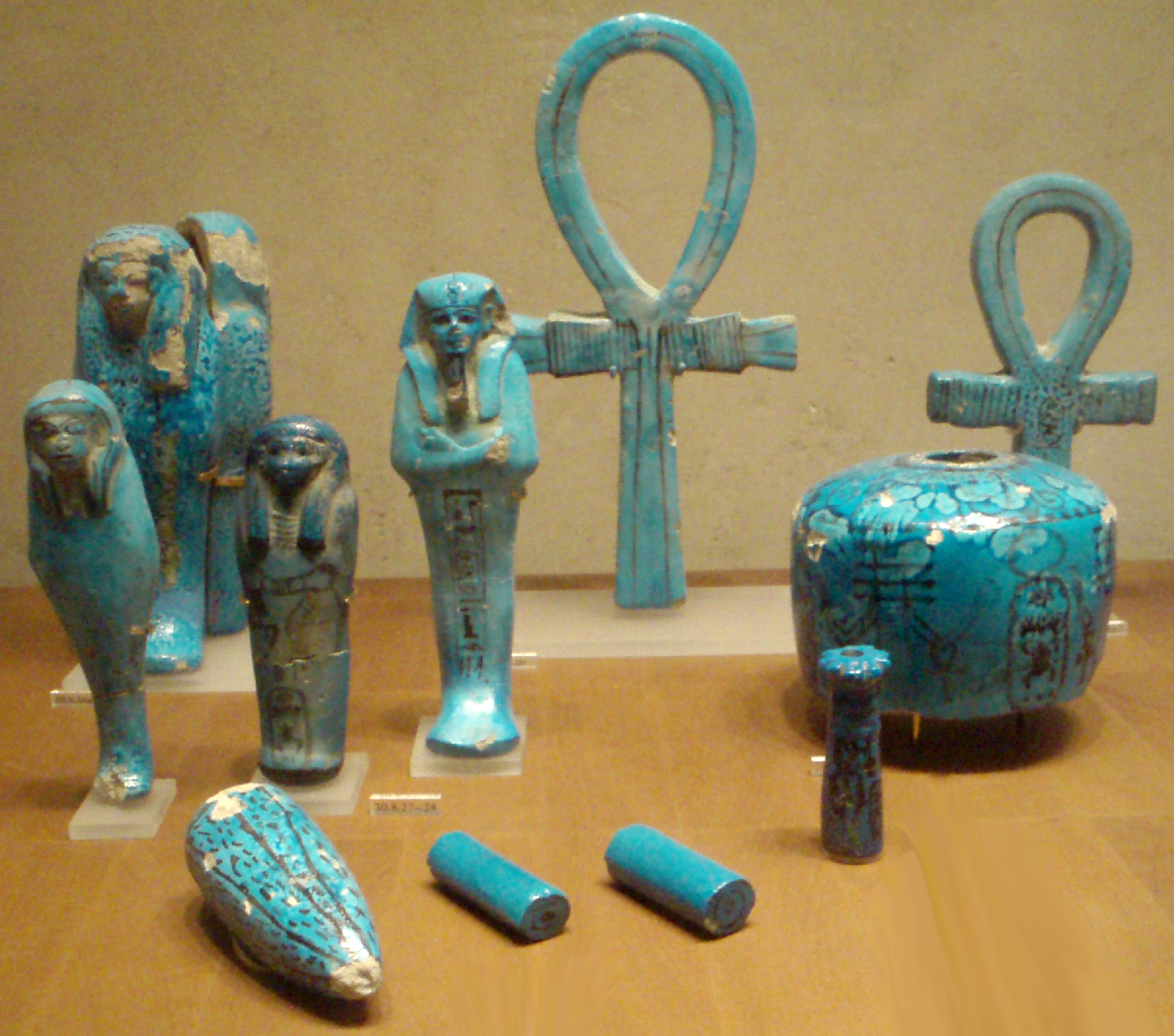
Faience shabti and assorted faience amulets, now in the Metropolitan Museum of Art

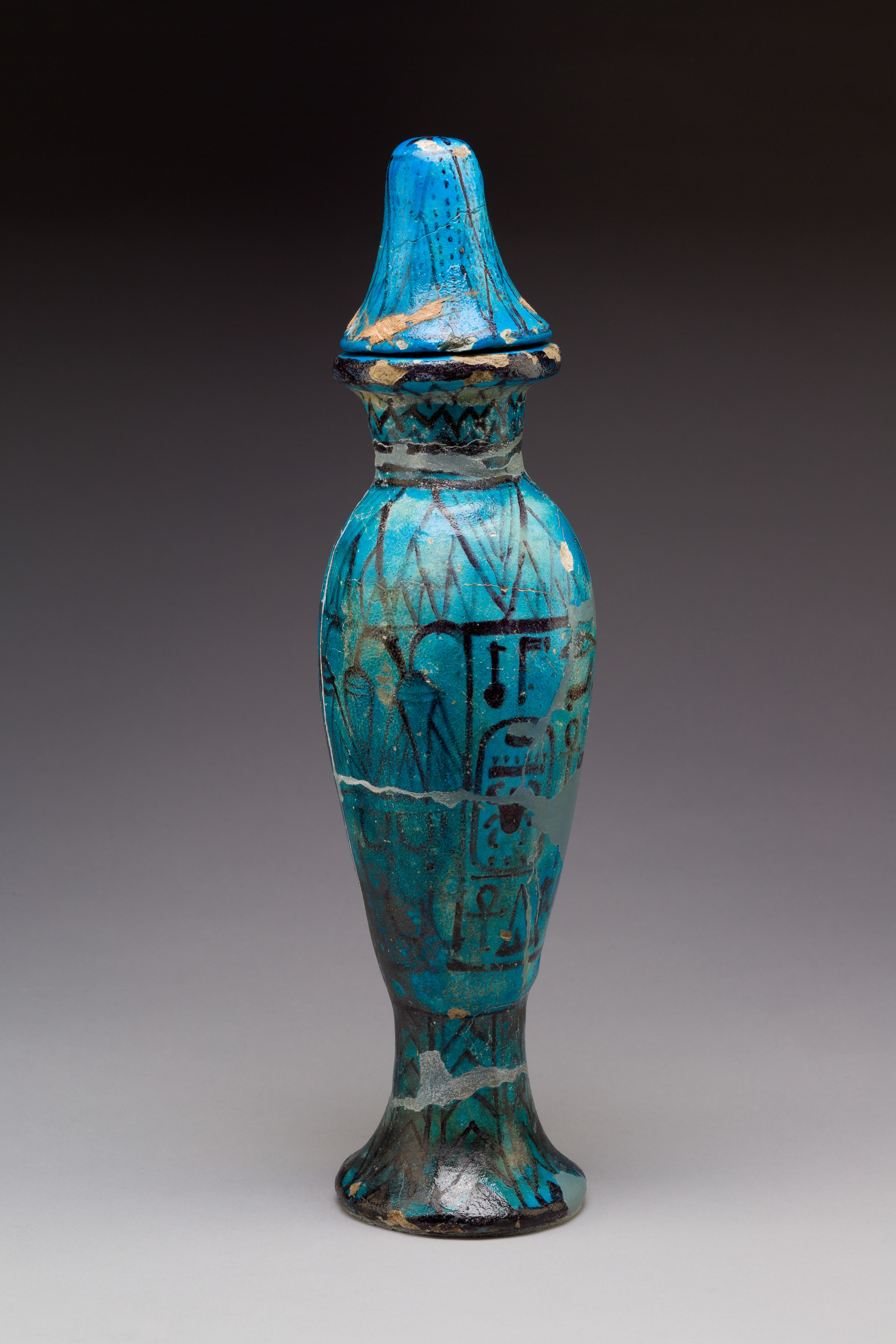
A hes-vase now in the Metropolitan Museum of Art
