= Userhet =

The ancient Egyptian noble Userhet was buried in tomb KV45 in the Valley of the Kings. He probably lived during the rule of Thutmose IV. Amongst his titles was Overseer of the Fields of Amun. He presumably received the honour of a burial in the royal necropolis because of his rank.
