= KV28 =

Ancient Egyptian tomb in the Valley of the Kings

- Burial site of Unknown
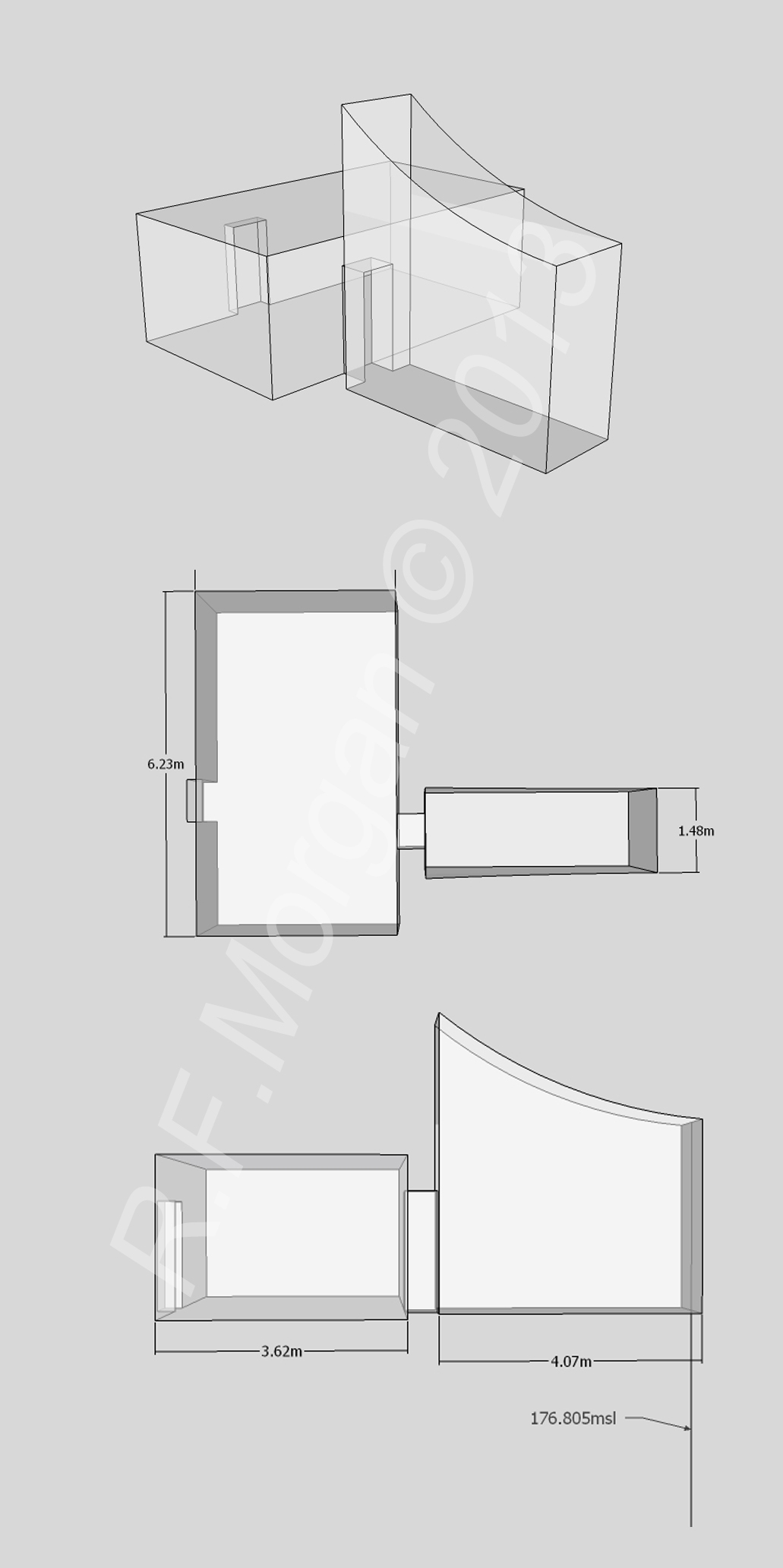
- Schematic of KV28

- Location within Egypt
- Coordinates: 25°44′23.3″N 32°36′11.3″E
- Location: East Valley of the Kings
- Discovered: Before 1832
- Excavated by: Donald P. Ryan (1990s)
- Decoration: Undecorated
- Layout: Shaft and chamber
- ← Previous; KV27 Next → KV29

Tomb KV28 is an ancient Egyptian tomb located in the Valley of the Kings in the Theban Necropolis in Upper Egypt. It consists of a short shaft leading to a single rectangular chamber. It has been known since the 1830s as it is mentioned by John Gardiner Wilkinson. In 1889 Eugène Lefébure said it contained parts of mummies and their bandaging. The tomb was excavated in the 1990s by Donald P. Ryan who found the bones of three individuals, fragments of a limestone canopic jar, numerous wooden fragments, and early to mid Eighteenth Dynasty pottery. The occupants were possibly nobles, given the tomb's proximity to the tomb of Thutmose IV.
