= Tomb of Yuya and Thuya =

Ancient Egyptian tomb of Yuya and Thuya

KV46
- Burial site of Yuya and Thuya
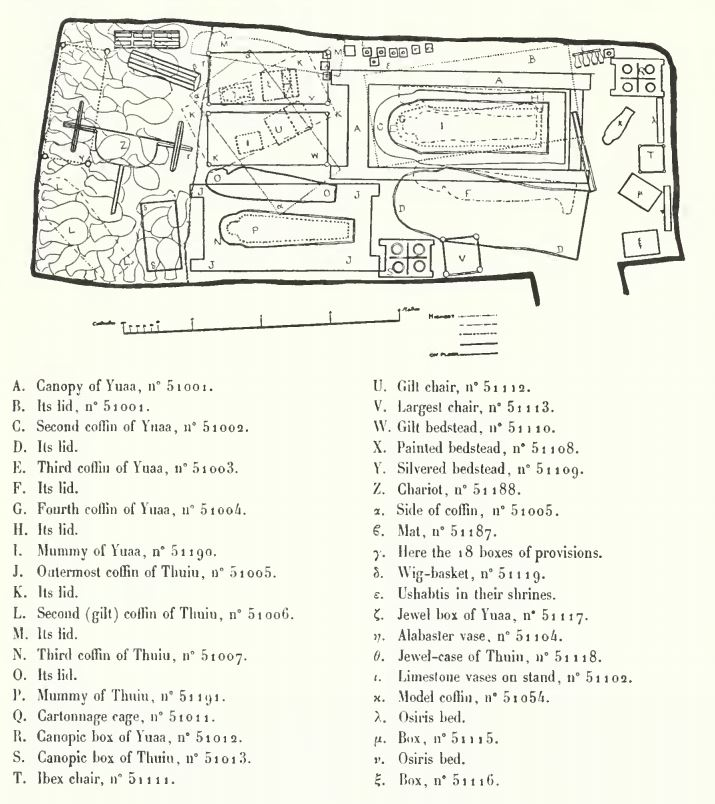
- Plan of the contents of KV46 from Quibell's 1908 publication

- Location within Egypt
- Coordinates: 25°44′27″N 32°36′10″E
- Location: East Valley of the Kings
- Discovered: 5 February 1905
- Excavated by: James E. Quibell
- Decoration: Undecorated
- Layout: Stairs and chamber
- ← Previous; KV45 Next → KV47

The tomb of Yuya and Thuya, also known by its tomb number KV46, is the burial place of the ancient Egyptian noble Yuya and his wife Thuya, in the Valley of the Kings. They were the parents of Queen Tiye, the chief wife of Pharaoh Amenhotep III, Tutankhamun's grandfather. Their tomb was discovered in February 1905 by the Egyptologist James E. Quibell, excavating under the sponsorship of the American millionaire Theodore M. Davis. The tomb was robbed in antiquity but preserved a great deal of its original contents including chests, beds, chairs, a chariot, and numerous storage jars. Additionally, the rifled but undamaged mummies of Yuya and Thuya were found within their disturbed coffin sets. Prior to the discovery of the tomb of Tutankhamun, this was considered to be one of the greatest discoveries in Egyptology.

== History ==
=== Burial and robberies ===
Yuya and Thuya were ancient Egyptian nobles who lived during the mid-Eighteenth Dynasty of Egypt's New Kingdom. The couple were from Akhmim, and held titles associated with the cult of the local god Min. Although non-royals, their daughter Tiye became the chief wife of Pharaoh Amenhotep III. They were buried in a private-style tomb in the Valley of the Kings.

Their tomb was robbed in antiquity, most probably three times: a first time shortly after the closure of the tomb, and then twice during the construction of the adjacent tombs KV3 and KV4. During the first looting, only perishable products such as oil were removed; those that had gone rancid were left. The second and third times however the looters took most of the jewellery and linen not directly associated with the mummies. A small effort was made to restore order to the tomb after the robberies, with Thuya's body covered by a shroud, boxes refilled, and the breached blocking partially re-stacked.

=== Discovery and clearance ===
The tomb of Yuya and Thuya, numbered KV46, was discovered on 5 February 1905 in excavations undertaken by James Quibell, on behalf of Theodore Davis. The tomb is located in a side valley between KV3 and KV4. Davis' previous 1902–1903 excavation season had discovered the tombs of Thutmose IV (KV43) and Hatshepsut (KV20) in a small side valley and excavations resumed in this area on 17 December 1904. Finding that nothing had been uncovered upon his arrival in January 1905, excavations shifted to a narrow, as-yet unexplored area between the tombs KV3 and KV4. This area was covered by a "great bank of chips, evidently artificial, and evidently untouched for a good long while" which Quibell thought might conceal an earlier tomb. Characterising the location as "most unpromising", Davis states in his publication that "good exploration justified its excavation, and that it would be a satisfaction to know the entire valley, even if it yielded nothing."

Excavation commenced on 25 January 1905 and on 6 February Davis was shown the first step of the tomb cutting by his excited foreman and workers; by the evening of 12 February the door was completely exposed. The door and decorated lintel were cut into the solid rock and measured 4.02 by 1.35 metres (13.2 ft × 4.4 ft). The doorway was blocked by stones cemented with mud plaster but was open for the top 18 inches (46 cm), indicating that the tomb had been opened and probably robbed in antiquity. Despite it being nearly dark, Davis and Arthur Weigall, the new Chief Inspector of Antiquities, peered through the gap in the blocking. They saw a steeply declining corridor and Davis spotted a cane lying close to the door. Lacking a ladder, a small boy, the son of the reis (foreman), was lifted in to retrieve the item; he returned with a gilded stone scarab and the yoke of a chariot in addition to the cane. That evening, Davis showed these items to Gaston Maspero who, intrigued both by the items and the identity of the tomb's owner, asked to be present at the entry into the tomb the next day.

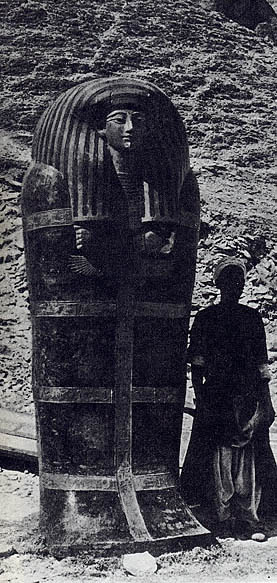
An Egyptian excavator beside the outer mummiform coffin of Yuya

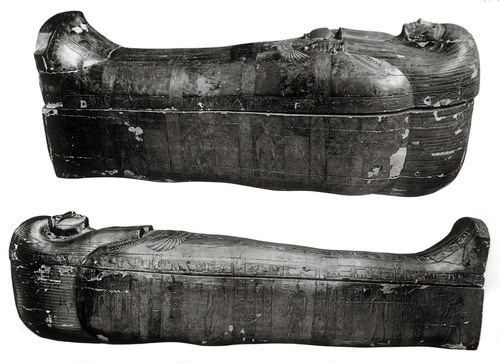
Second and inner coffins of Yuya

On the morning of 13 February the blocking was carefully dismantled and Davis, Maspero, and Weigall entered the tomb. The group used candles for illumination as, although electricity was installed at the doorway, electricians were not present to extend it into the tomb. Quibell was not in attendance as he was at Edfu acting as the official guide of the Duke of Connaught. After descending down the steep corridor, a blocked and plastered doorway stamped with seals was encountered; this too had been breached at the top in antiquity. On either side of the doorway were pottery bowls containing the remains of the mud plaster used to seal the blocking. Catching glimpses of gold glittering in the candlelight, the trio took down the top course of the blocking and entered the burial chamber. Davis describes the first moments:

The chamber was as dark as dark can be and extremely hot... We held up our candles, but they gave so little light and so dazzled our eyes that we could see nothing except the glitter of gold.

Looking to identify the owner of the tomb, they inspected a large wooden coffin on which Maspero read the name 'Yuya'; Davis recounts that, in his own excitement, he nearly touched the candles to the black resin surface. Realising how close they had come to a possible fiery death, they made a hurried exit and returned later with electric lights.

The space was revealed to be filled with a jumble of objects including sarcophagi, gilded and silvered coffin sets, canopic chests, a chariot, beds, chairs and other items of furniture, and various vessels. The riffled but intact mummies of Yuya and Thuya were lying in their coffins.

The risk of robbery was felt to be very real despite the presence of guards, so the contents were planned, recorded, photographed, and packed for transport to the Egyptian Museum in Cairo as quickly as possible. On 3 March the entire contents of the tomb had reached the river; they were loaded onto a train the next day and arrived under armed guard to the museum.

During the clearance of the tomb, the excavators received a visit from a woman who, unknown to them, was Empress Eugenie of France. Nevertheless, Quibell looked to entertain his guests, and apologised for the fact that most of the contents had been packed away for shipping to Cairo. Joseph Lindon Smith, who assisted with the excavation recalls the following exchange:

The woman replied, "Do tell me something of the discovery of the tomb."

Quibell said, "With pleasure, but I regret that I cannot offer you a chair."

Quickly came her answer. "Why, there is a chair which will do for me nicely." And before our horrified eyes she stepped down onto the floor of the chamber and seated herself in a chair that had not been sat in for over three thousand years!

The chair in question was the throne of Princess Sitamun; surprisingly its strung seat held up the unexpected guest, as the two men were too embarrassed to tell her to get up.

== Architecture ==
KV46 is a large private-style tomb, similar in size to the original layout of KV62 which was adapted for the burial of Tutankhamun. A fifteen-step staircase leads to a descending corridor 1.76 metres (5.8 ft) wide and 2.05 metres (6.7 ft) high. This is followed by a further set of short stairs that lead to a second corridor with stairs and niches; this corridor has a vaulted ceiling. There is a single rectangular burial chamber, the western third of which is 1 metre (3.3 ft) deeper than the rest of the floor. The walls of the tomb are not decorated and were not smoothed, possibly due to the poor quality of the limestone. The only markings on the walls are black dots 40 centimetres (16 in) apart on the smoother walls which may be mason's marks.

== Contents ==
Until the discovery of Tutankhamun's tomb in 1922, this was the richest and best preserved tomb found in the valley, and the first to be found with major items in situ. The many objects crammed into the chamber led Weigall to liken the tomb to "entering a town house which had been closed for the summer".

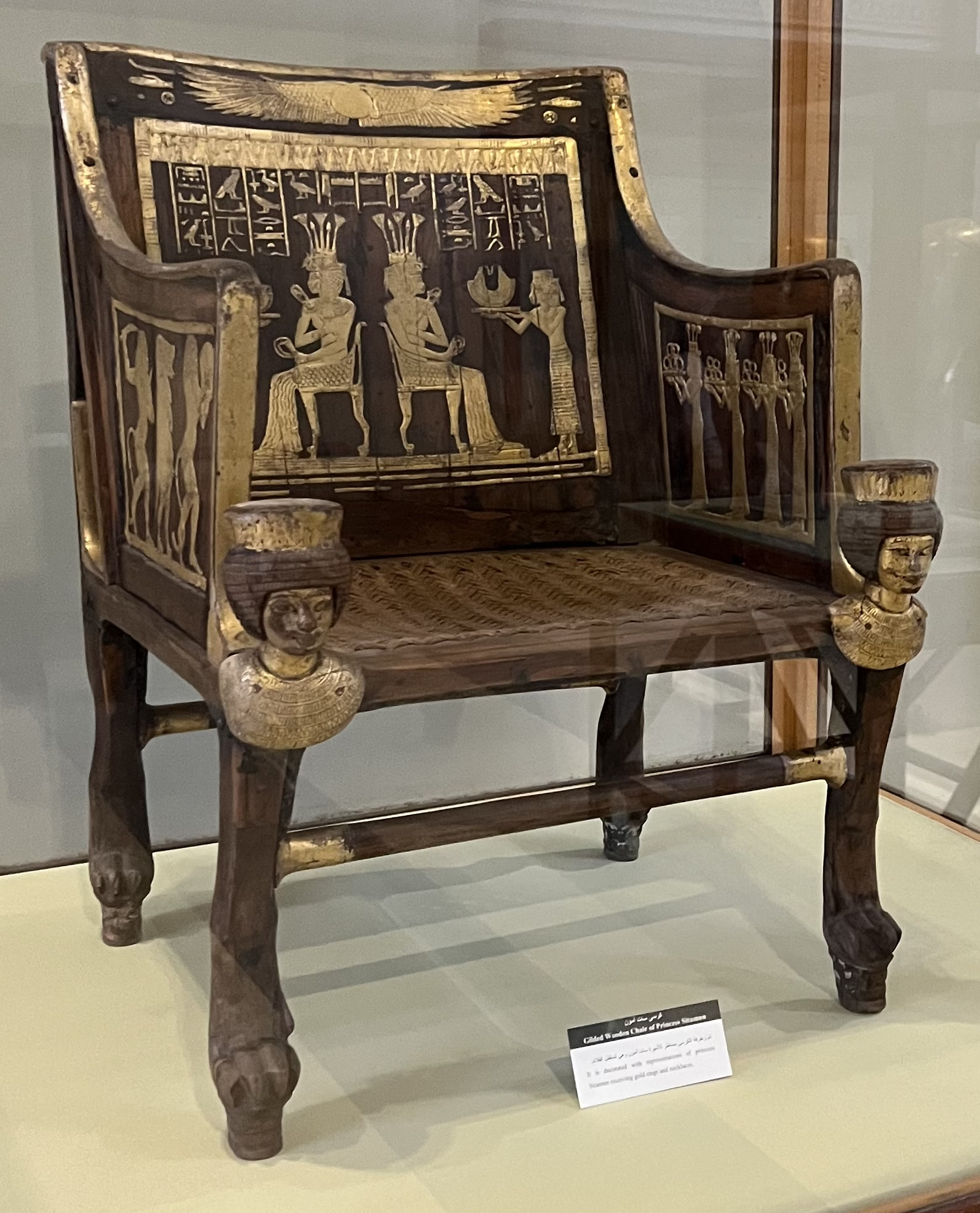
Throne of Sitamun from the Tomb of Yuya and Thuya (Egyptian Museum)

Domestic furniture was readily apparent, as to the left of the doorway sat the largest of the three chairs in the tomb. The wooden chair, known as the chair or throne of Sitamun, is veneered with a red wood and features gilt decoration; the back rest has a doubled scene of the seated Sitamun, their granddaughter, receiving a collar from a servant. The chair is of suitable size for an adult. To the right stood another chair, the smallest, known as the 'ibex chair' as its arms have an open-work design of a kneeling ibex. The third chair also small and is entirely gilded. The back rest features Queen Tiye, seated, with a large cat under her chair, accompanied by Sitamun, and another daughter on a papyrus boat. The chair was likely for a child and wear to the gilding suggests it was well-used before being placed into the tomb.

The large wooden sarcophagi and coffin sets of Yuya and Thuya occupied most of the space in the tomb, with Yuya's against the northern wall and Thuya's against the southern; both sarcophagi faced west. Their large size meant they must have been assembled and possibly finished in the tomb, as there are no breaks in the gilded decoration. One end of Yuya's sarcophagus had been broken in and the lid displaced; the lids of his three nested coffins had been removed, with two laid on top of each other partially supported by the chair of Princess Sitamun and the third on its side against the coffins. His gilt cartonnage mask was broken and his mummy had been investigated by robbers, as the body lay in the remnants of its torn wrappings. Thuya's sarcophagus had been partially dismantled, with the lid placed on one of the two beds and one side placed on top of it, and the southern side had been placed against the wall. This allowed her two nested coffins to be removed; the lid of the outer one had been thrown atop one of the beds while the trough had been thrown into the far corner of the tomb. The inner coffin still had its lid on.

The canopic chests were placed close to the sarcophagi of their respective owners and were likewise facing west. The two boxes are very similar, having sloping roofs and gilded plaster decoration on black backgrounds. The lids of both boxes had been moved but the alabaster canopic jars and embalmed viscera, which in the case of Thuya were shaped like mummies and wearing gilt masks, were undisturbed. Under the beds and in the corner by the door were caskets and boxes, while inside or under the upturned coffin lids and troughs were various items including cushions, a wig, alabaster vases, and lids of caskets. The chests and boxes contained items such as sandals, model tools for ushabti, cloth, and the lids of ushabti boxes.

A total of nineteen ushabti were present in the tomb – fifteen inscribed for Yuya and four for Thuya. Most of the ushabti were still in their boxes, placed between Yuya's sarcophagus and the wall; a further four were recovered from a box by the doorway. The majority of the figures are made of wood, several of cedar and one of ebony, often with gilded faces and wigs or collars. Thuya's ushabti are more expensive than her husband's, as two are covered with silver leaf with gold details and two are gilded. Yuya has an unusual example made of copper sheet over a wooden core. The figures are inscribed with Spell 6 of the Book of the Dead, instructing them to do the work of the deceased in the realm of the dead; Yuya's alabaster ushabti is uninscribed. Seven of Yuya's ushabti were stolen from the Egyptian Museum during the 2011 Egyptian revolution; six have since been recovered.

The western third of the room with the lower floor was filled with fifty-two large vessels containing natron; above the pots was a bed, a large reed mat, a wig basket, the cartonnage mummy bands of Thuya, and eighteen boxes of dried foods.

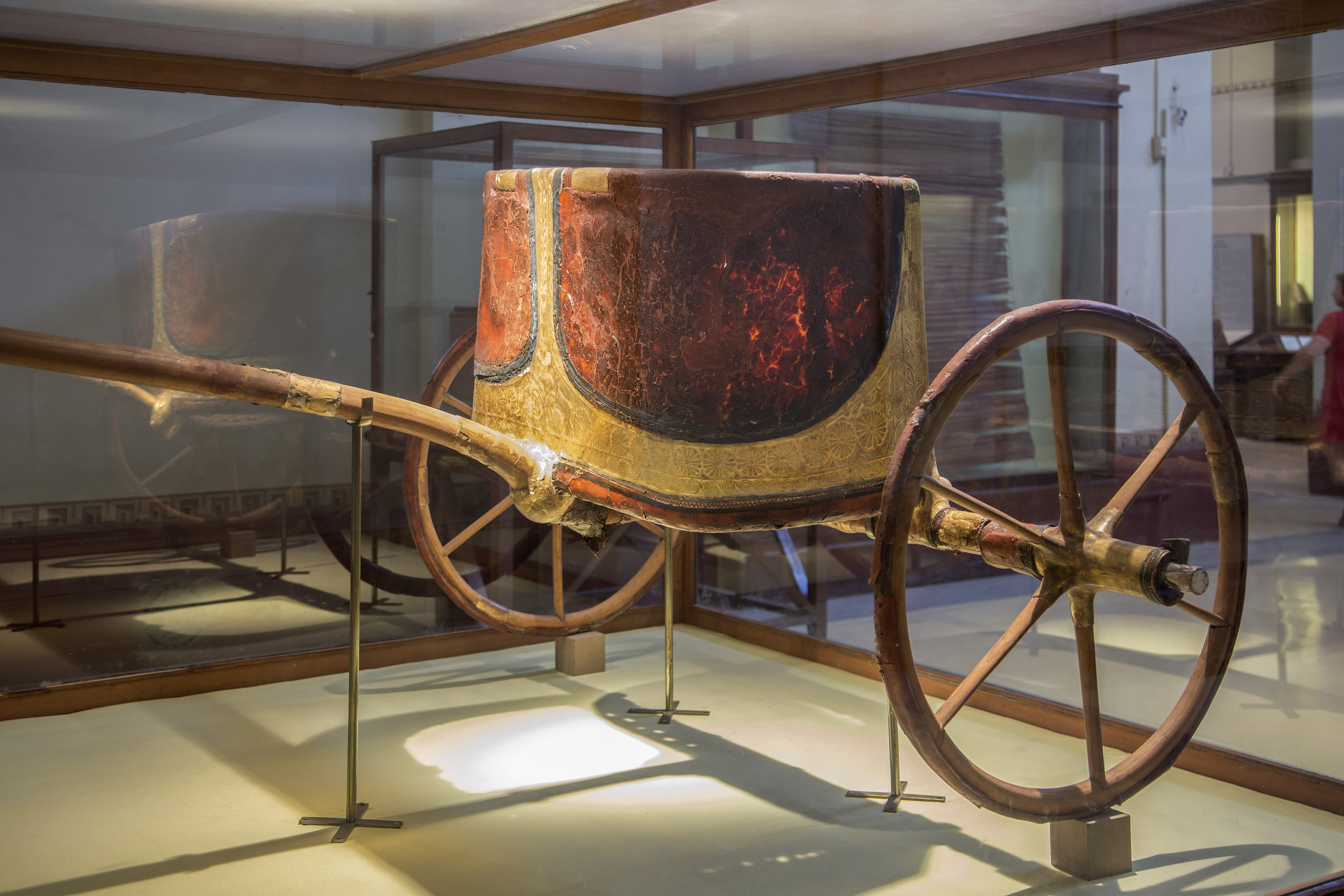
Yuya's Chariot in the Egyptian Museum

Also placed in this area was the chariot of Yuya, found to be in a nearly perfect state of preservation. The thin wooden body, which curves to meet the handrail at the centre and sides, features a raised design in gilded plaster of a tree of life flanked by two browsing goats, standing upright. The rest is filled by rosettes and spirals, with a design of a combined lotus-tree of life above the axles. The interior of the body paneling is painted green. The sides of the chariot were filled by panels of red leather with green applique borders; these panels had been ripped away by tomb robbers. A similar panel remains in place at the back of the chariot. The floor is D-shaped and constructed of a woven leather mesh covered by a piece of red leather. The body is supported by the pole and axletree. The wheels have six spokes and are secured to the axle with leather pegs; the projecting outer end of the axle is covered with silver foil. The wheels have red leather tyres which show very little wear, leading to suggestions that it was used only for the funeral procession. The pole is approximately 2 metres (6.6 ft) long and decorated with three bands of gold foil and capped with silver foil. It was fitted with a wooden yoke, made from a single piece of wood, which was pegged and tied into place with green leather lashing. The yoke too features decorative gilded bands. Quibell suggests the chariot was a gift from the king as it's too low to be used by horses and that the gilt decoration made it unsuitable for practical use.

Another find was Yuya's copy of the Book of the Dead, measuring 9.7 metres (32 ft) and containing forty chapters, many of which were illustrated with vignettes. In his publication, Edouard Naville characterises it as a "good specimen of a Book of the Dead of the XVIIIth Dynasty." It was written in cursive hieroglyphs, as was typical for the era. The chapters were prepared beforehand, with spaces left for the insertion of the owner's name and titles. Later, a second scribe with slightly different handwriting added the names, adapting to the available space which resulted in longer, shorter, or entirely absent titles. Some of the chapters are abbreviated, with those accompanied by vignettes often the most shortened due to insufficient space being allowed for the text. The papyrus begins with a scene of Yuya and Thuya adoring Osiris. Here, and again in a later chapter, Yuya is depicted with white hair, possibly as a sign of old age. The first chapter is accompanied by a vignette of the funeral procession, with the mummy arriving at the tomb on a sledge pulled by men and cattle. Other chapters include those which allow the deceased to take the forms of various animals, to defeat their enemies, prescriptions for ideal funerary amulets, and the weighing of the heart. The final chapter is followed by two lines declaring the text to be "drawn, checked, examined, weighed from part to part", an assurance from the writer that the preceding work is reliable.

In his publication of the tomb, Davis claims he declined Maspero's offer of a share of the tomb's contents, citing that it "ought to be exhibited intact." However, Quibell's later catalog notes that three wooden ushabti were in Davis' possession; he later bequeathed three shabti, two shabti boxes, model tools for shabti, a pair of sandals, and two sealed storage jars from the tomb to the Metropolitan Museum in 1915.

== Mummies ==
The well preserved mummified bodies of Yuya and Thuya were found in their coffins, although both had been disturbed and partially unwrapped by robbers. Davis was particularly struck by Thuya, who was lying covered in fine cloth, with only her head and feet exposed. The Australian anatomist Grafton Elliot Smith was the first to examine the bodies for Quibell's 1908 publication of the tomb in which he characterizes them both as "perfect" examples of the embalmer's art.

=== Yuya ===
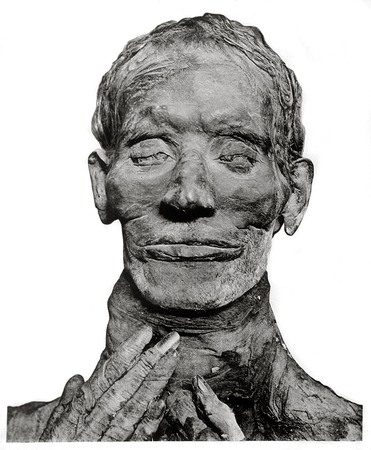
The mummy of Yuya

The mummy of Yuya was found still partially wrapped, with only his torso being divested of wrappings by ancient robbers. Despite this disturbance, the thieves had missed the gold plate (113 by 42 millimetres (4.4 in × 1.7 in)) covering the embalming incision. When the body of Yuya was removed from his innermost coffin, a partially strung necklace composed of large gold and lapis lazuli beads was found behind his neck, where it had presumably fallen after being snapped by robbers. The intact wrappings covering the head were removed before the body was shipped to Cairo.

The body of Yuya is that of an old man, 1.651 metres (5.42 ft) tall, with white wavy hair now discoloured by the embalming process; his eyebrows and eyelashes are dark brown. The arms are bent with his hands placed under his chin. A gold finger stall was found on the little finger of the right hand. There were linen embalming packs placed in front of the eyes, and the body cavity was stuffed with resin-treated linen packs. Smith guessed his age at death to be sixty based on outward appearance alone. CT scanning has estimated his age at death to be fifty to sixty years, based on the level of joint degeneration and tooth wear; his cause of death could not be identified. Maspero judged that, based on the position of the sarcophagi, Yuya was the first to die and be interred in the tomb. However, the large eyes and small nose and mouth seen on his funerary mask suggests it was made during the last decade of the reign of Amenhotep III, meaning he may have outlived Thuya.

While Smith notes that his features are not classically Egyptian, he considers that there was much migration from neighbouring countries throughout Egyptian history and "it would be rash to offer a final opinion on the subject of [Yuya's] nationality."

=== Thuya ===
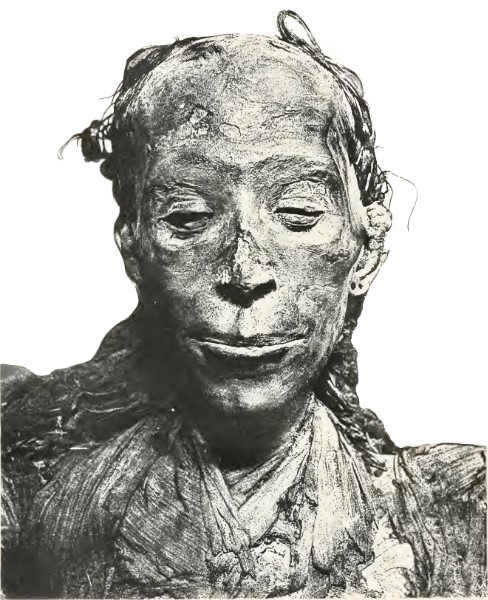
The mummy of Thuya

The wrappings of Thuya were more disturbed than those of Yuya. She was covered with a large linen shroud knotted at the back and secured by four bandages. These bands were covered with resin and opposite each band was the gilded titles of Thuya cut out of gold foil. The resin coating on the lower layers of bandages preserved the impression of a large broad collar.

The body of Thuya is that of an elderly woman of small stature, 1.495 metres (4.90 ft) in height, with white hair. Her arms are straight with the hands against the outside of her thighs. Her embalming incision is stitched with thread, to which a carnelian barrel bead is attached at the lower end; her body cavity is stuffed with resin-soaked linen. When Douglas Derry, (who later conducted the first examination of Tutankhamun's mummy) assisting Smith in his examination, exposed Thuya's feet to get an accurate measurement of her height, he found her to be wearing gold foil sandals. Smith estimated her age at more than fifty years based on her outward appearance alone. CT scanning has estimated her age at death to be fifty to sixty years old. The scan also revealed that she had mild scoliosis with a Cobb angle of 25 degrees. No cause of death could be determined.

== Objects found in KV46 ==
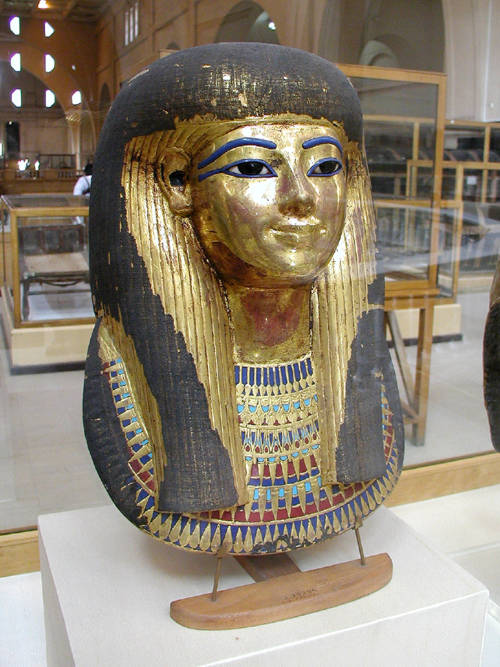
Mummy mask of Thuya

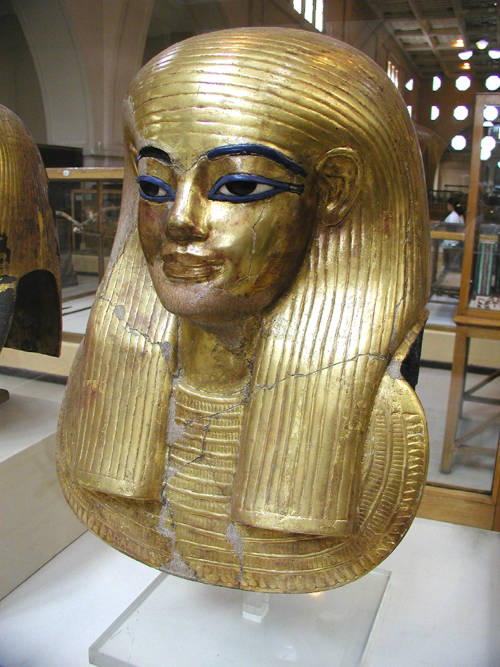
Mummy mask of Yuya

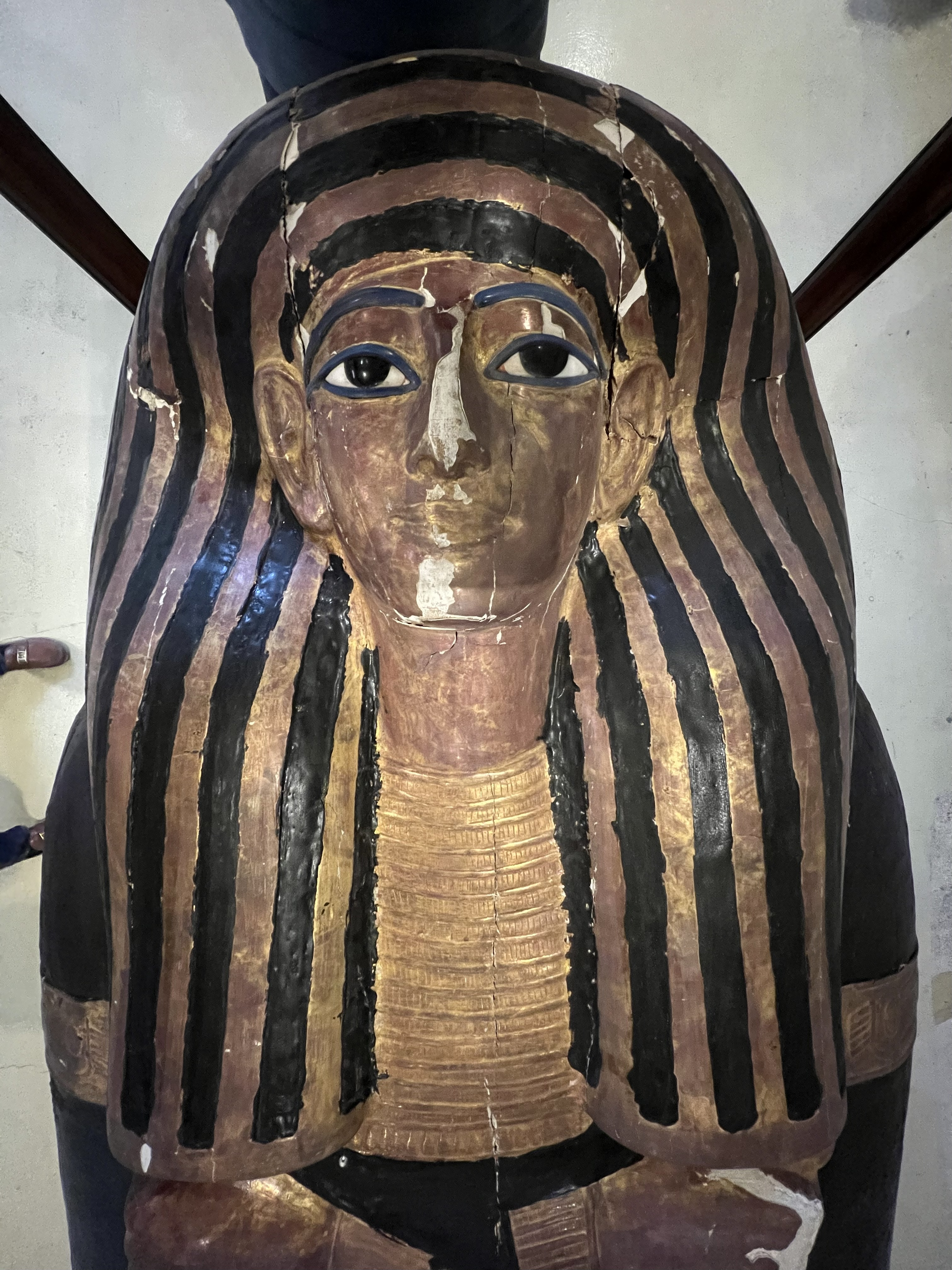
Yuya's middle coffin

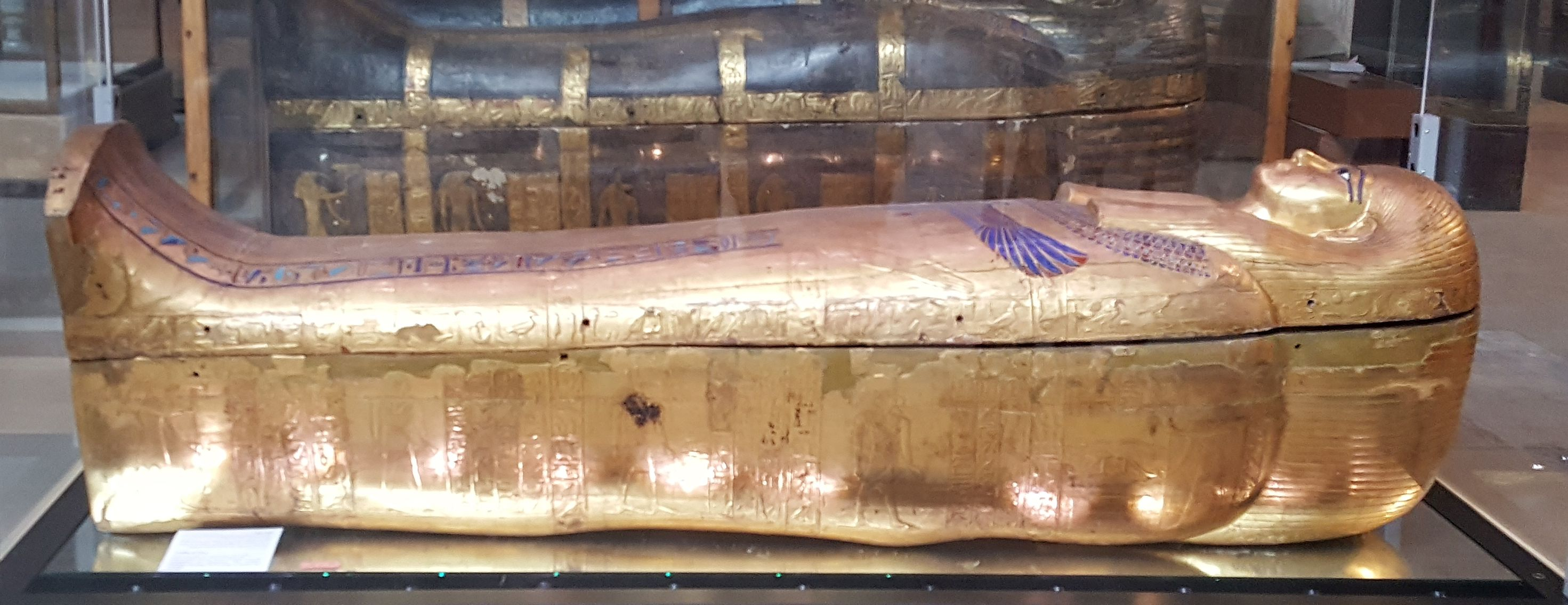
Yuya's inner coffin

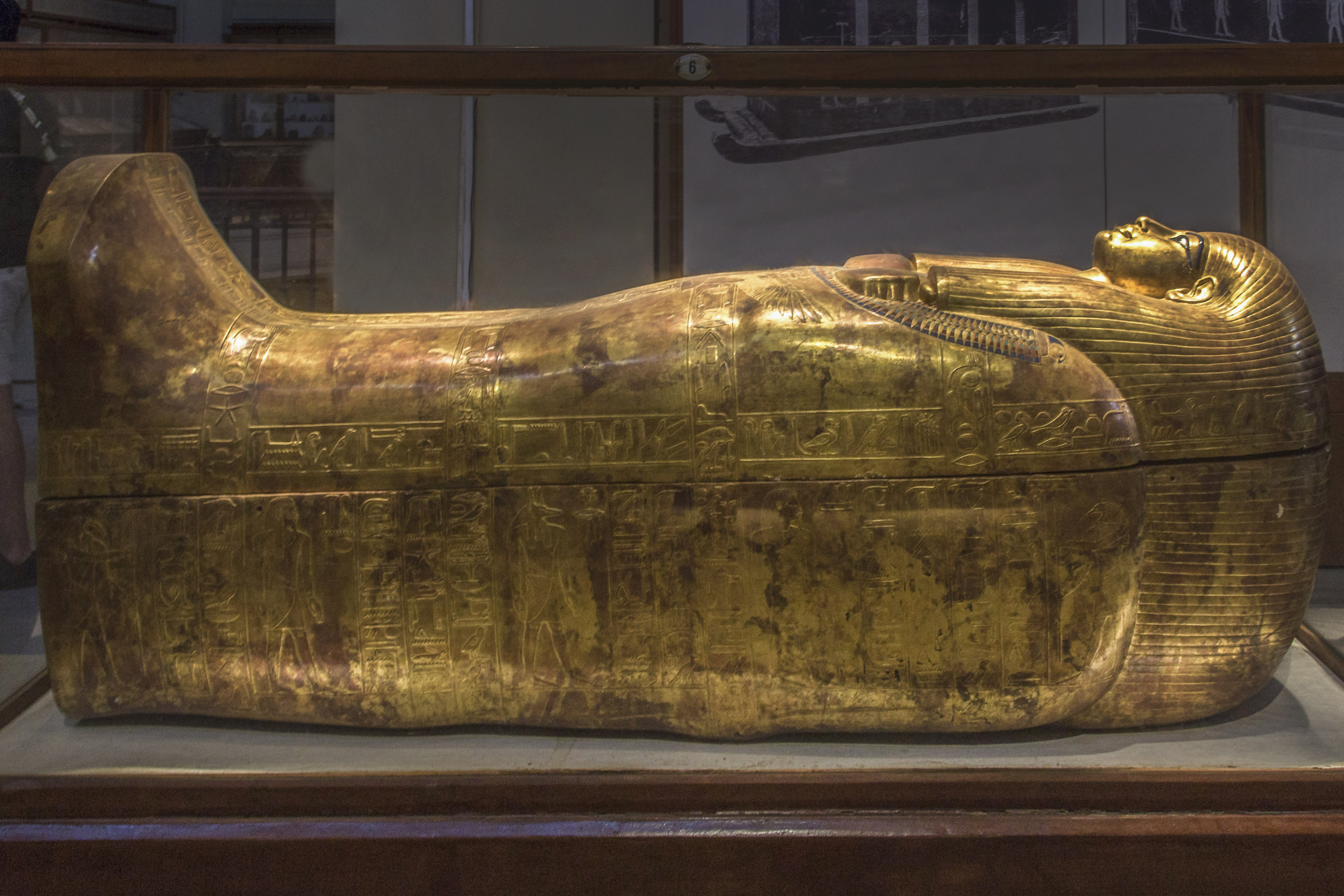
Thuya's outer coffin

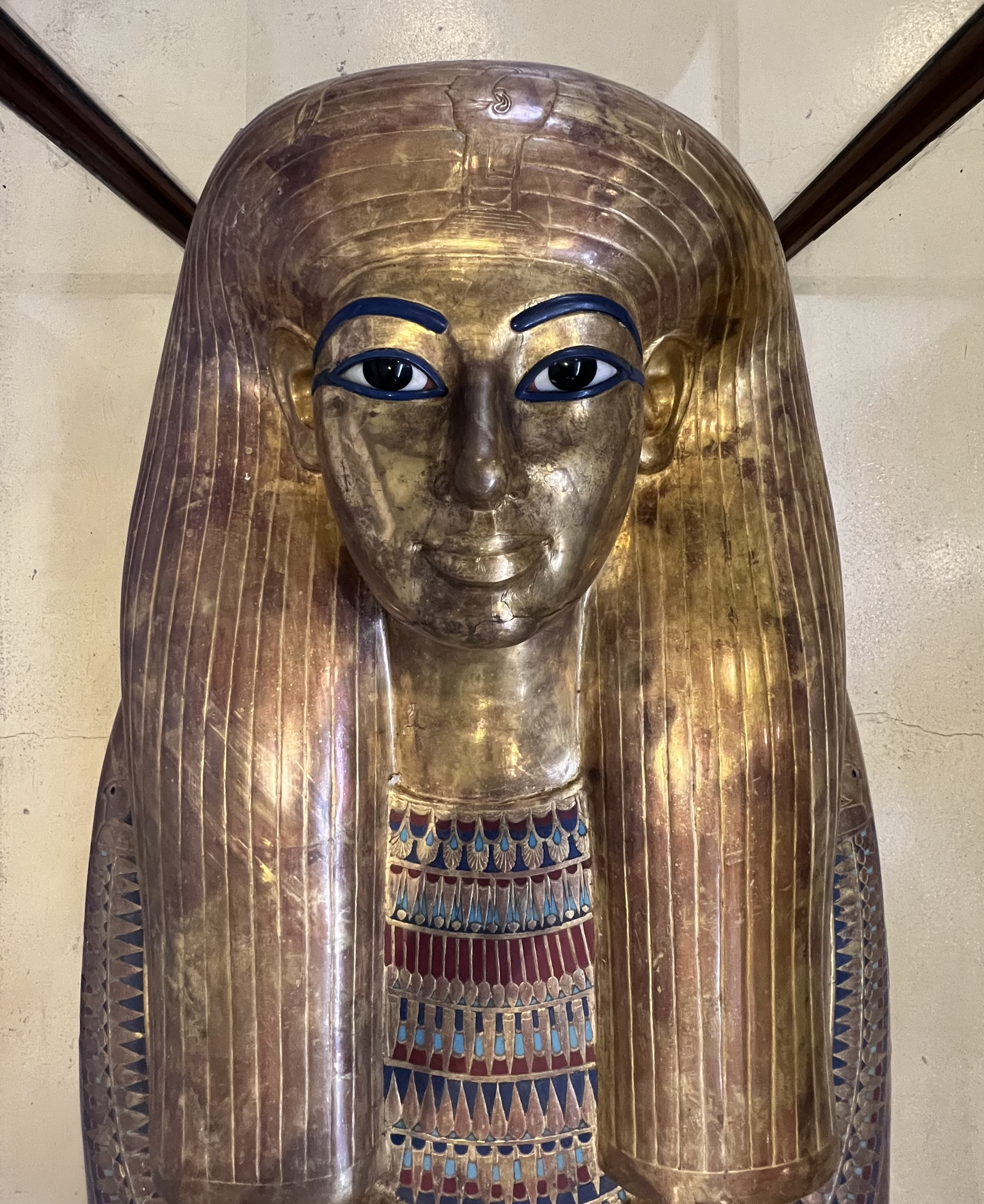
Thuya's middle coffin

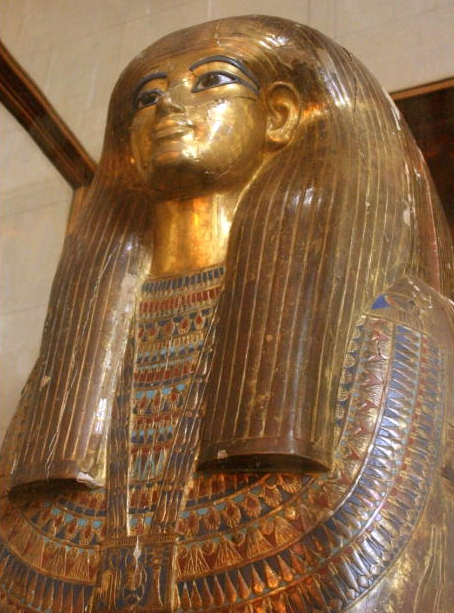
Thuya's inner coffin

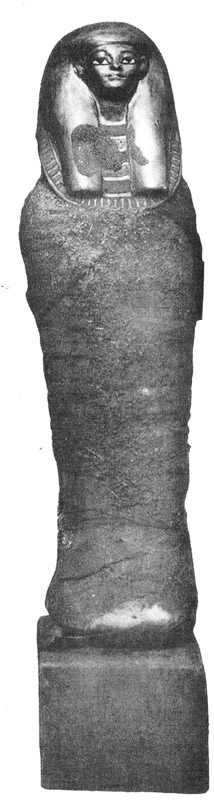
Mummified entrail of Thuya with cartonnage mask

Yuya's Canopic jars and canopic shrine

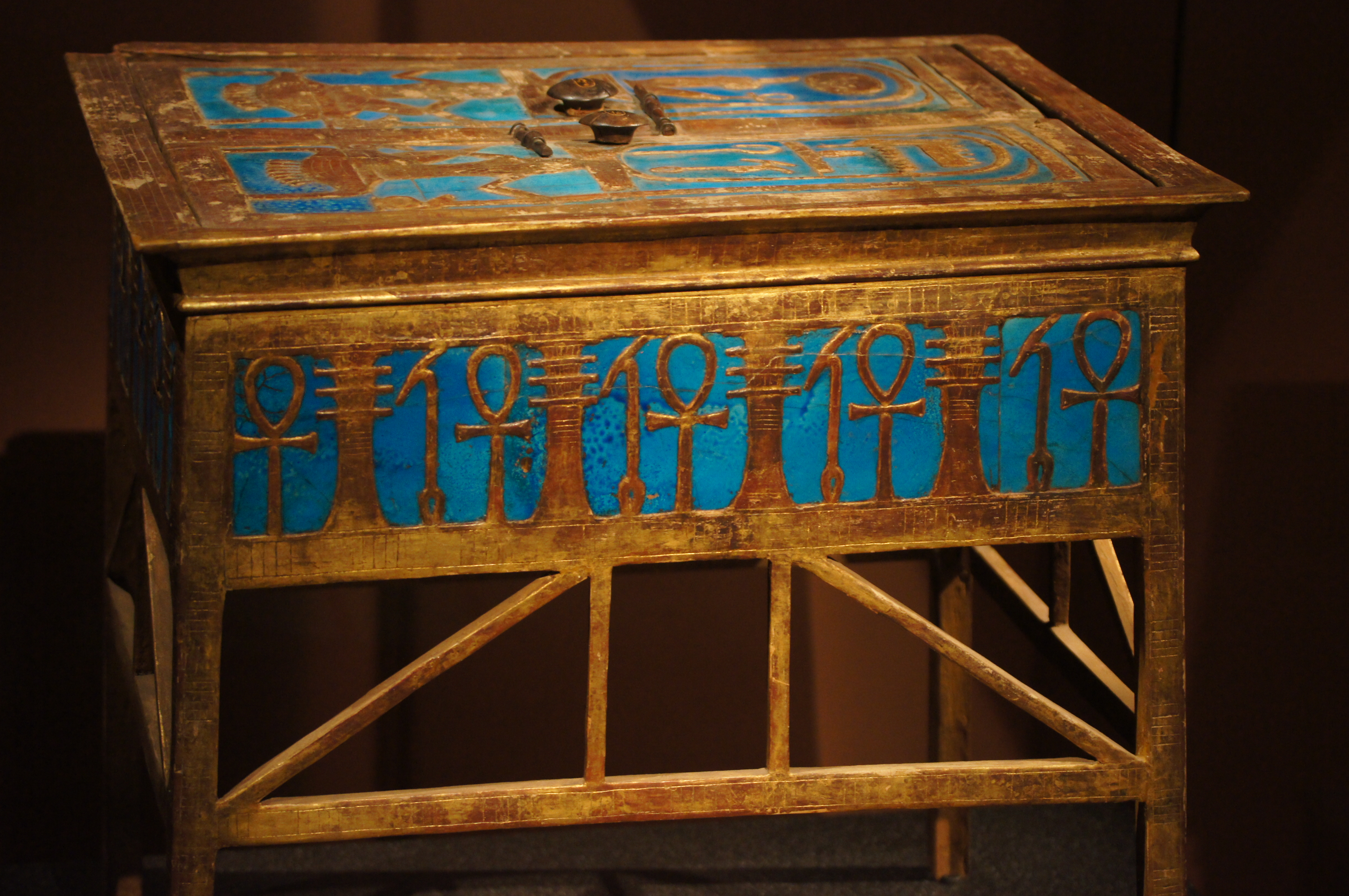
Blue enamelled and gold coffer jewellery box bearing the royal cartouche of Amenhotep III

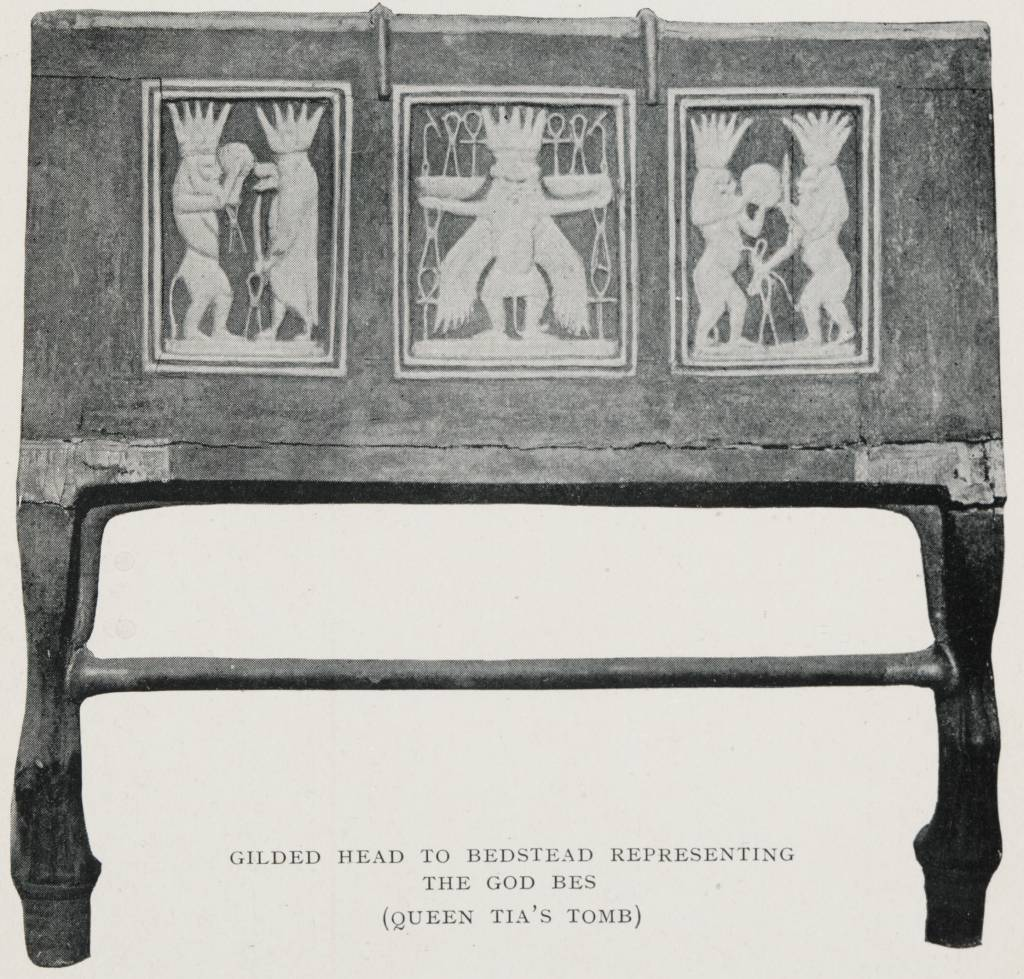
Gilded head to bedstead representing the god Bes

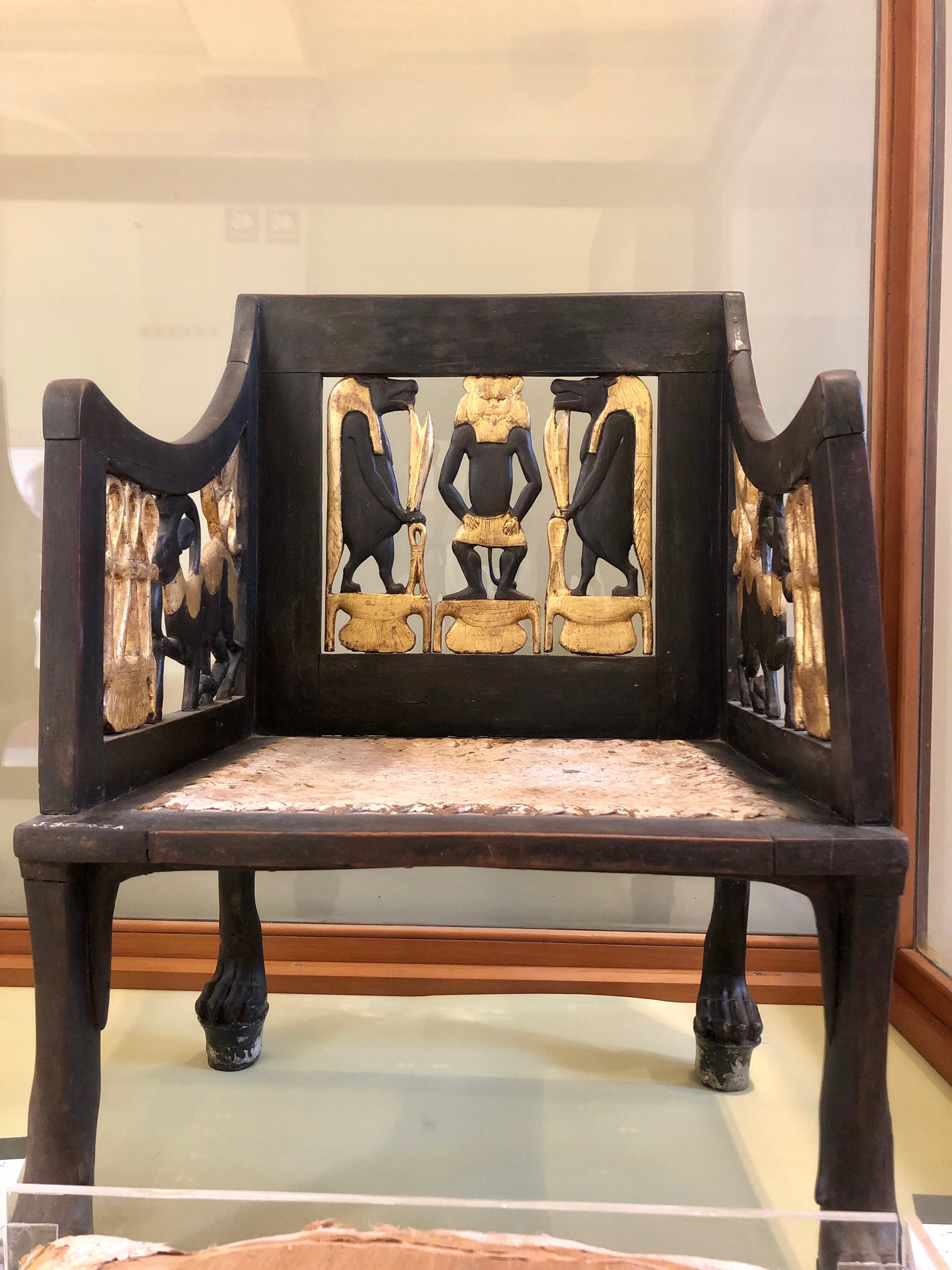
The gilded 'ibex' chair

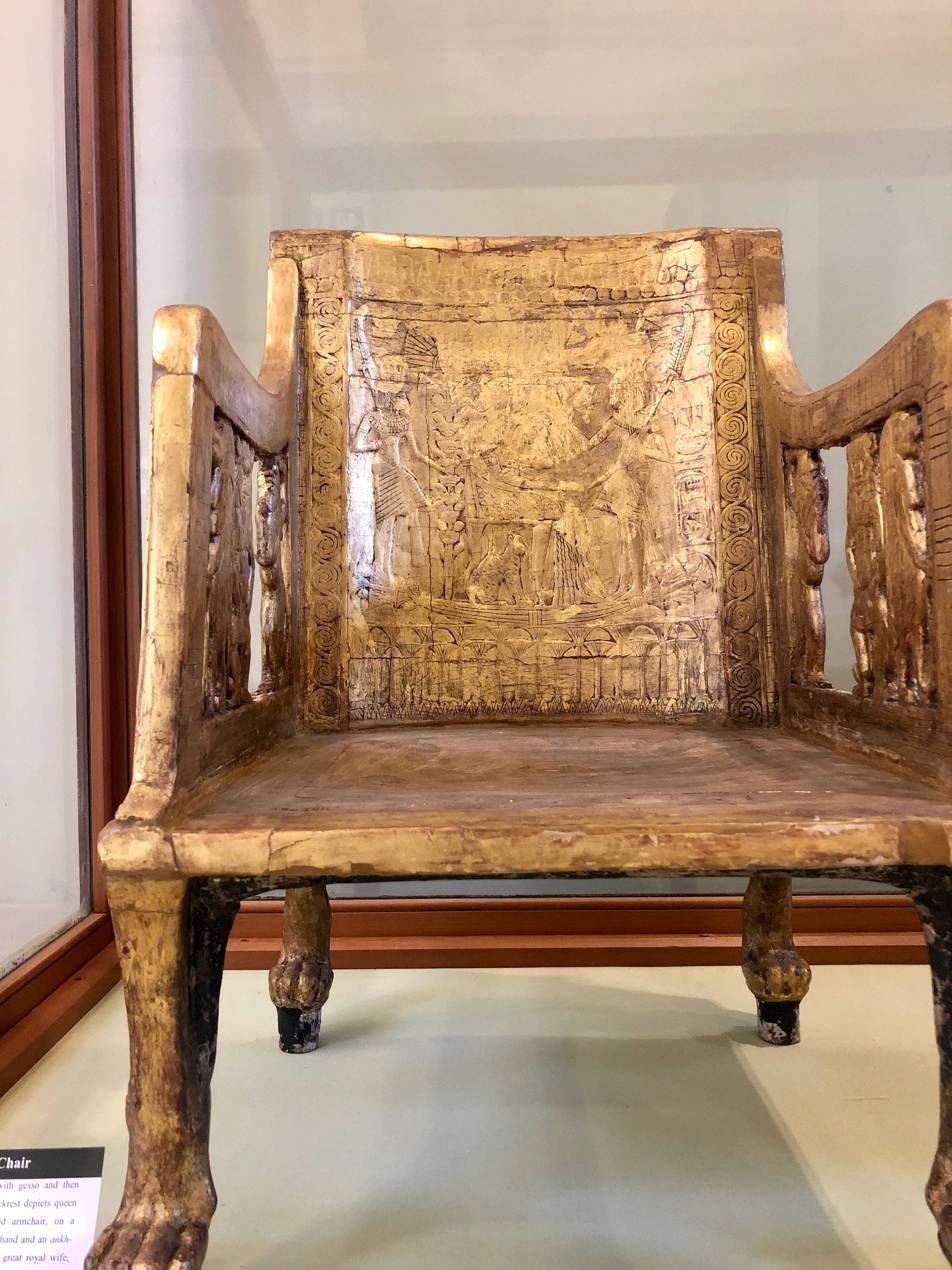
A gilded chair, the back depicts a boating scene

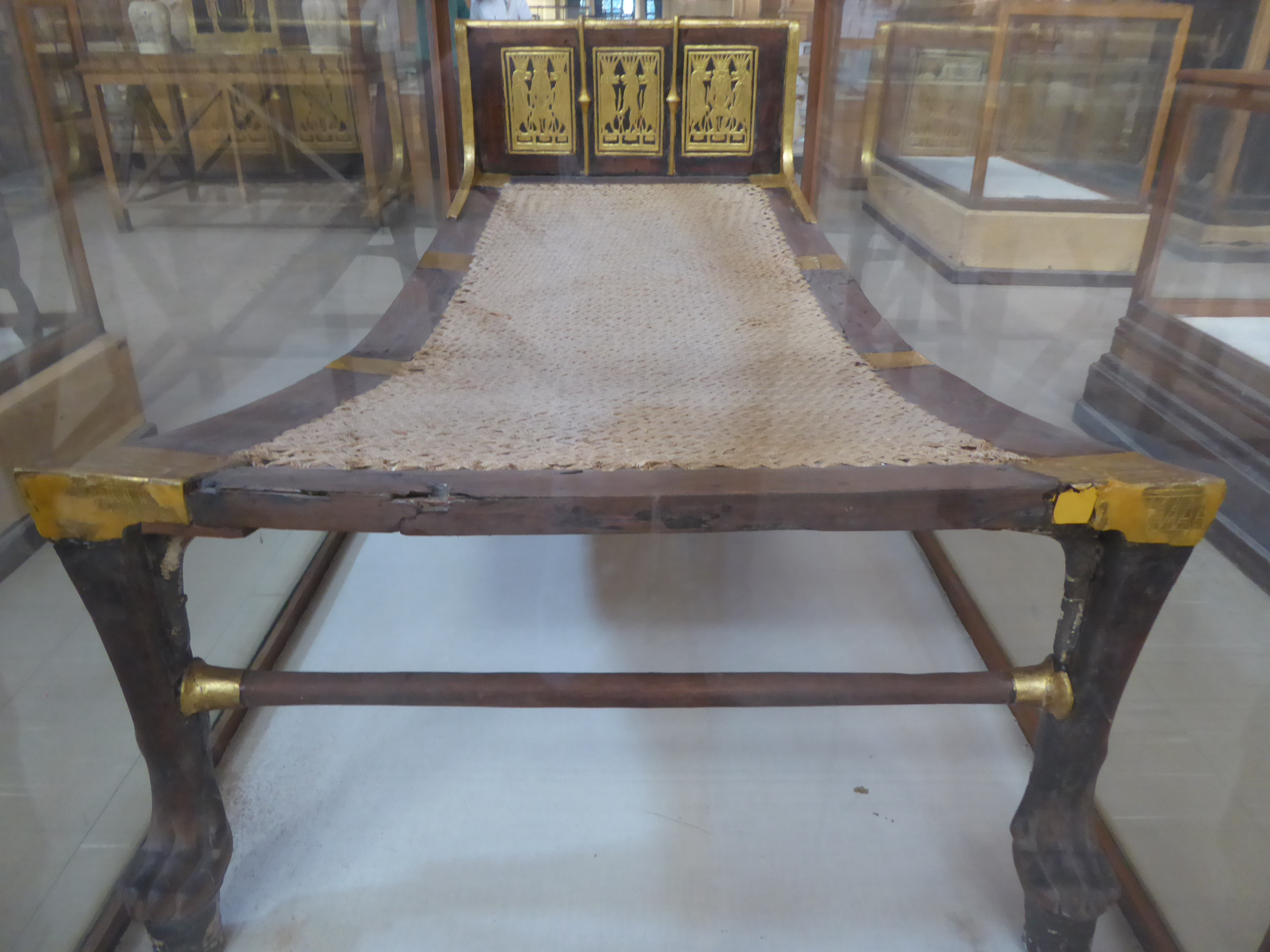
Yuya and Thuya's bed in the Egyptian Museum

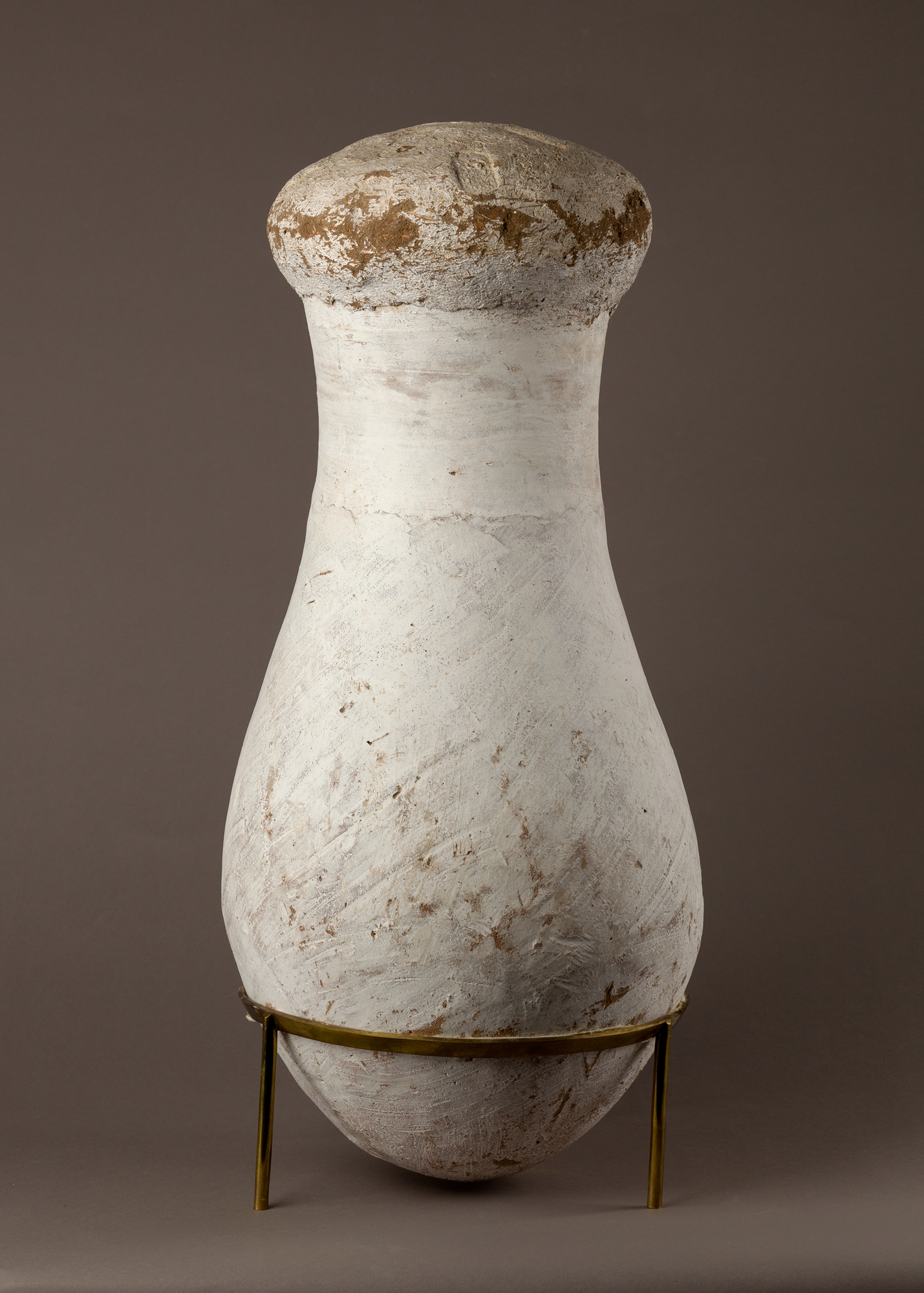
Sealed storage jar, now in the Metropolitan Museum of Art

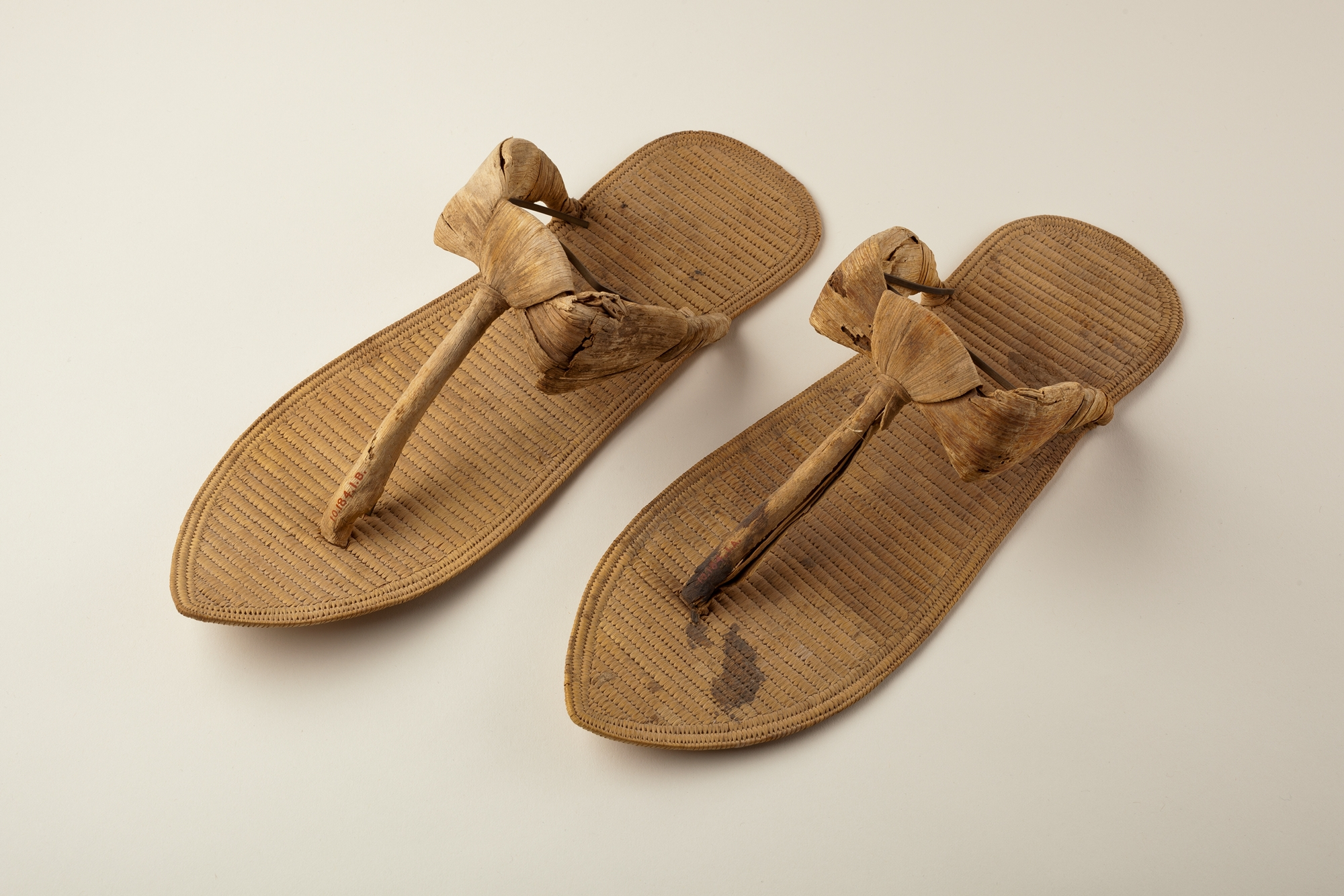
Pair of sandals, now in the Metropolitan Museum of Art

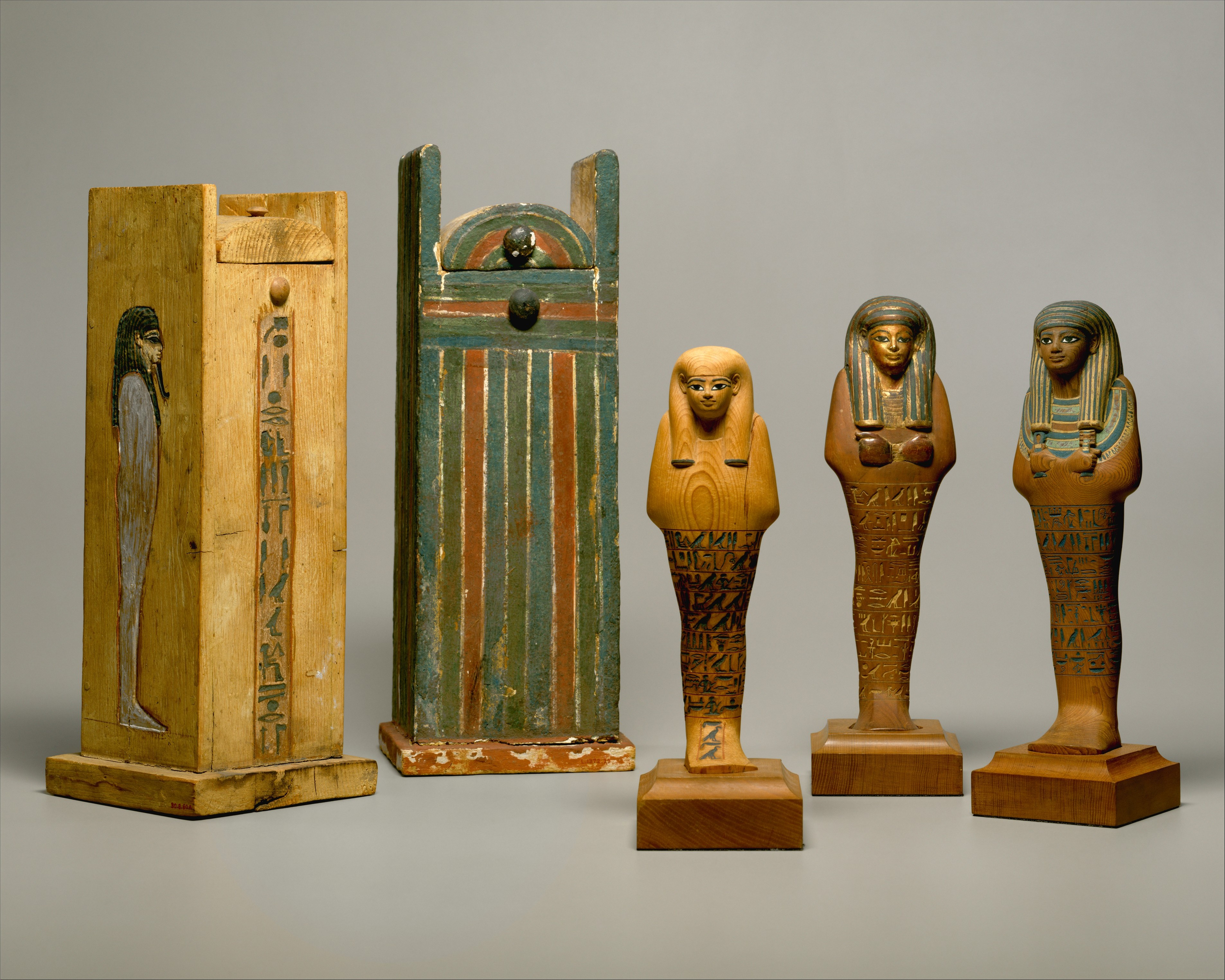
Shabti and shabti boxes of Yuya, now in the Metropolitan Museum of Art

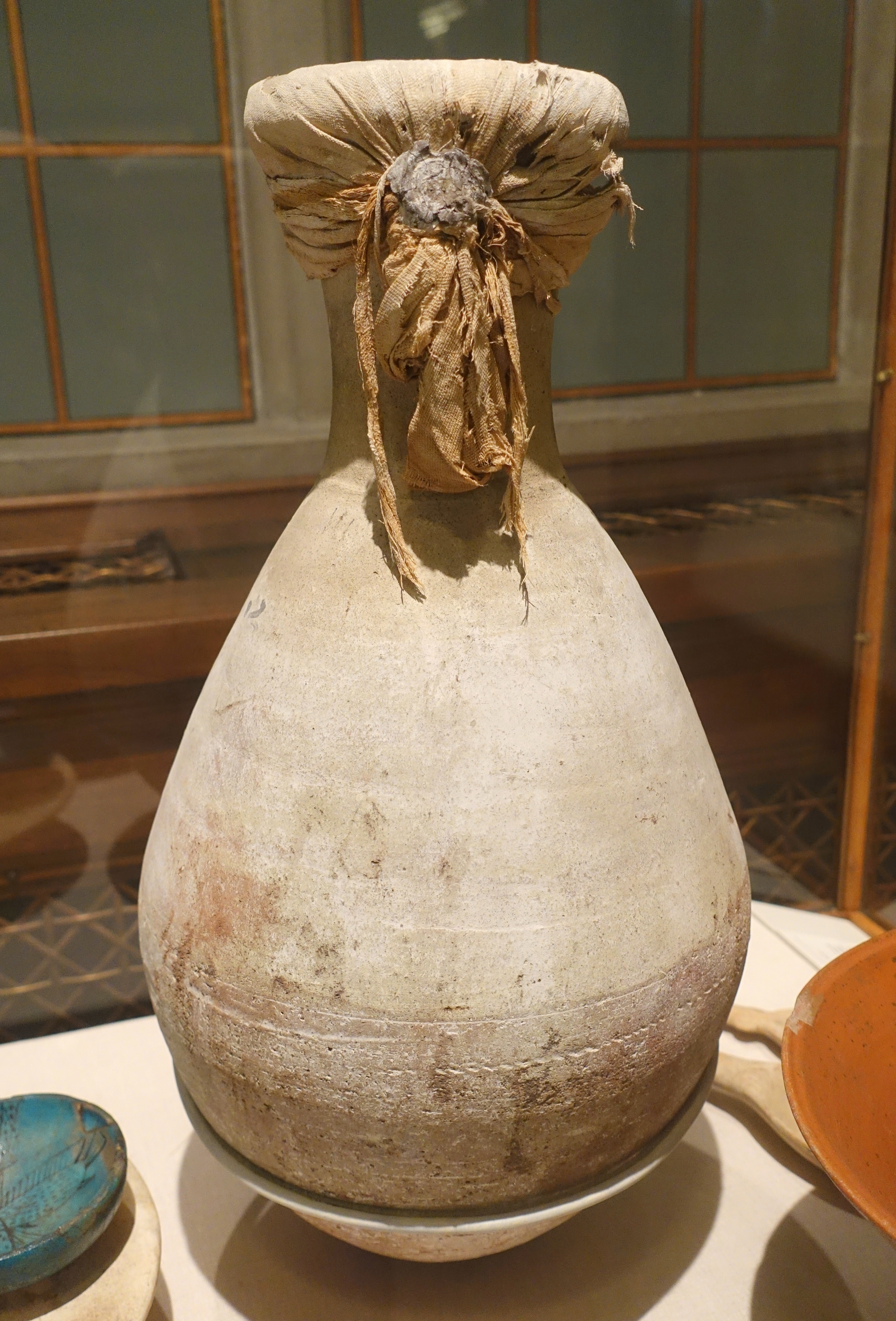
Food storage jar, now in the Oriental Institute Museum, University of Chicago

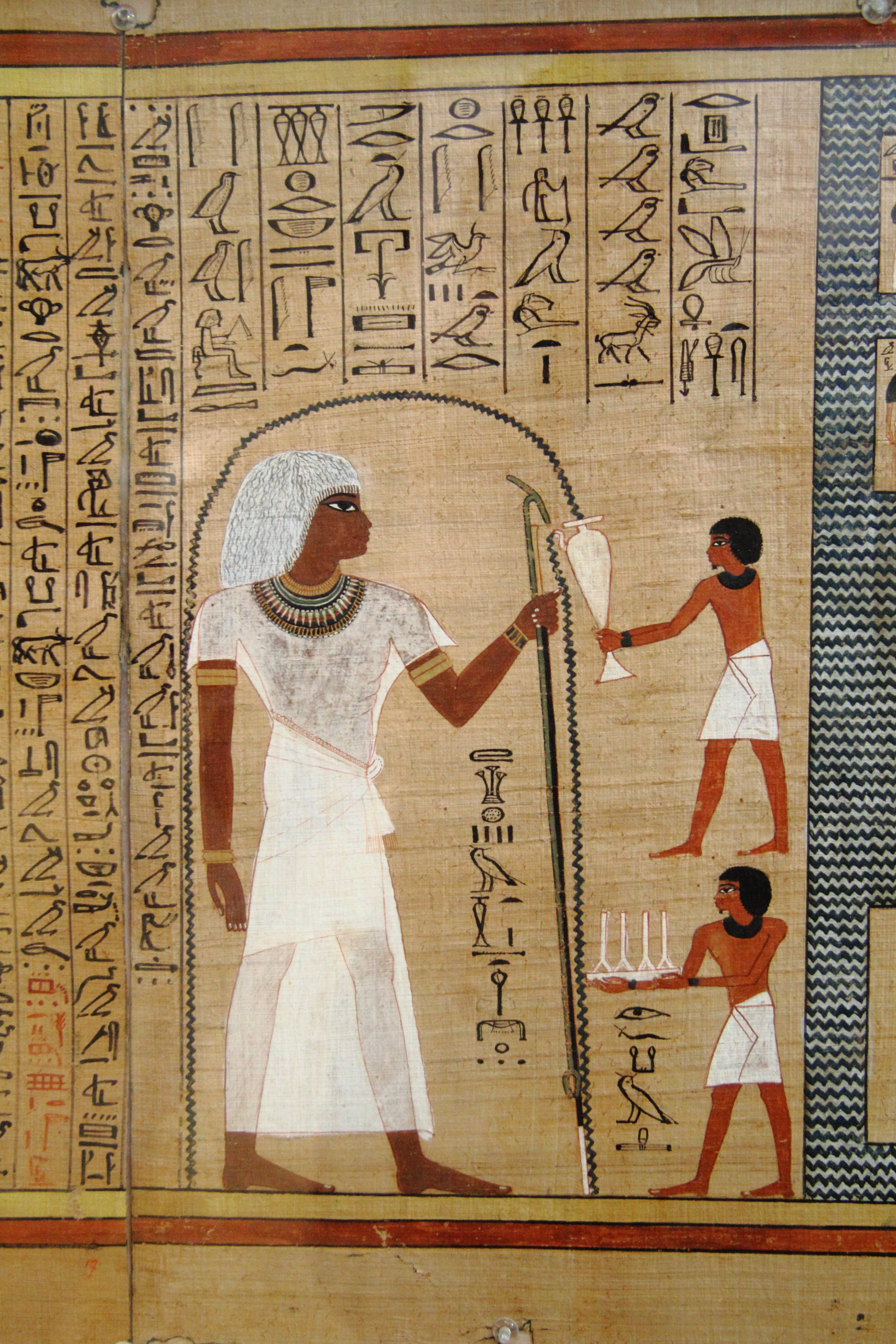
Vignette of Yuya from his Book of the Dead

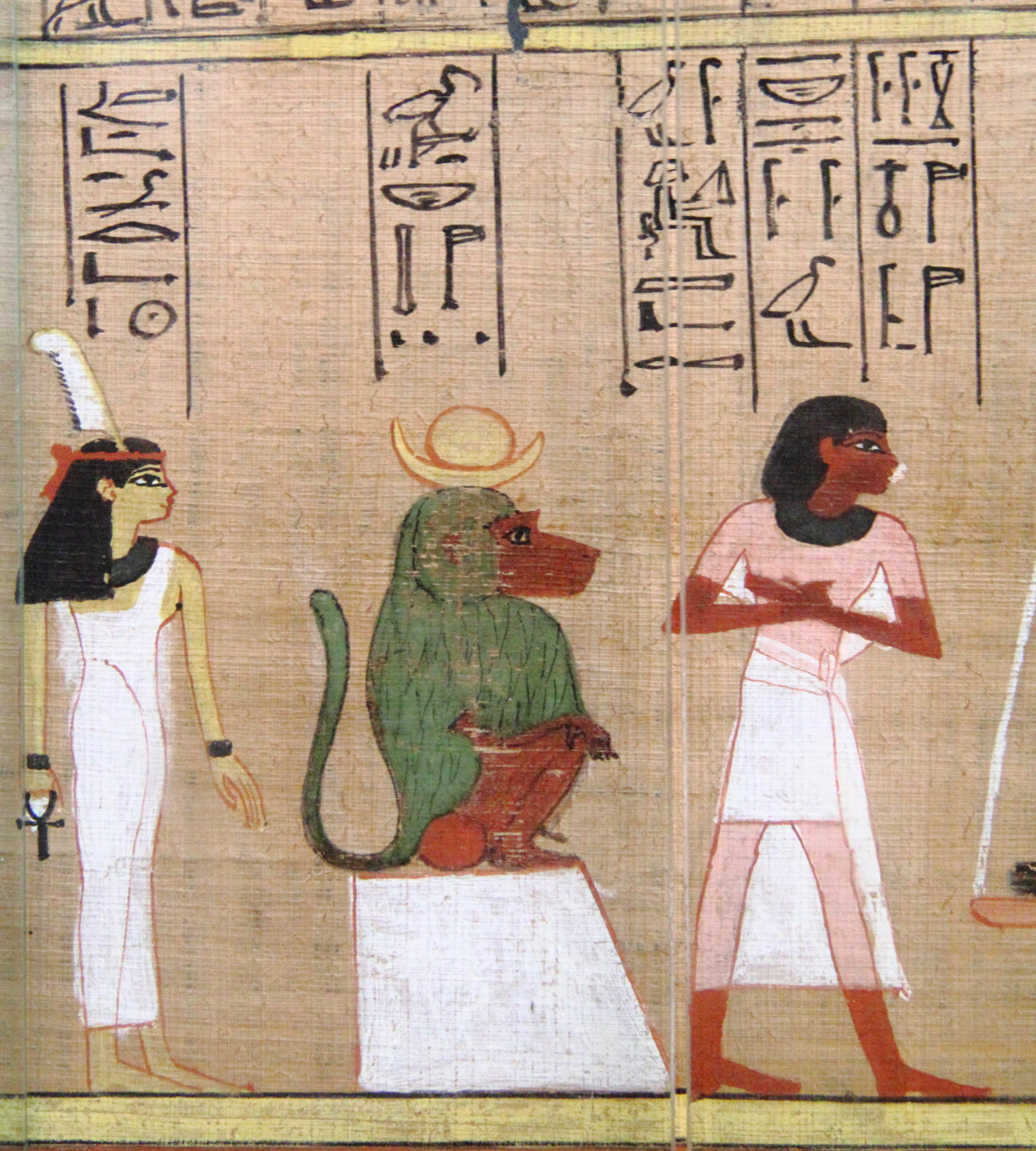
Depiction of Thuya (left) and Yuya from Yuya's Book of the Dead

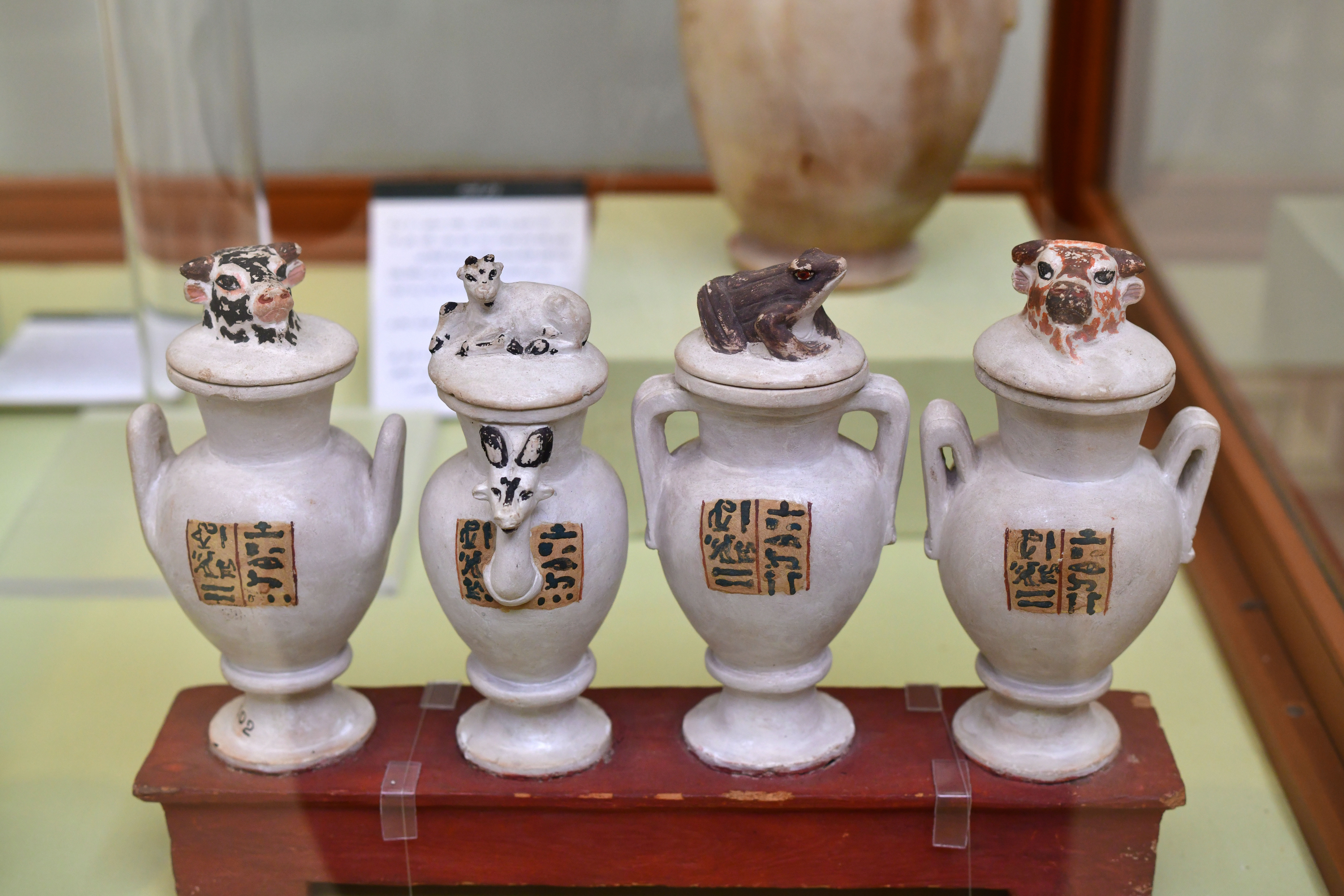
Four model vases with zoomorphic lids
