= Ushabtis of Yuya =

Shabti of Yuya, father in law of Amenhotep III

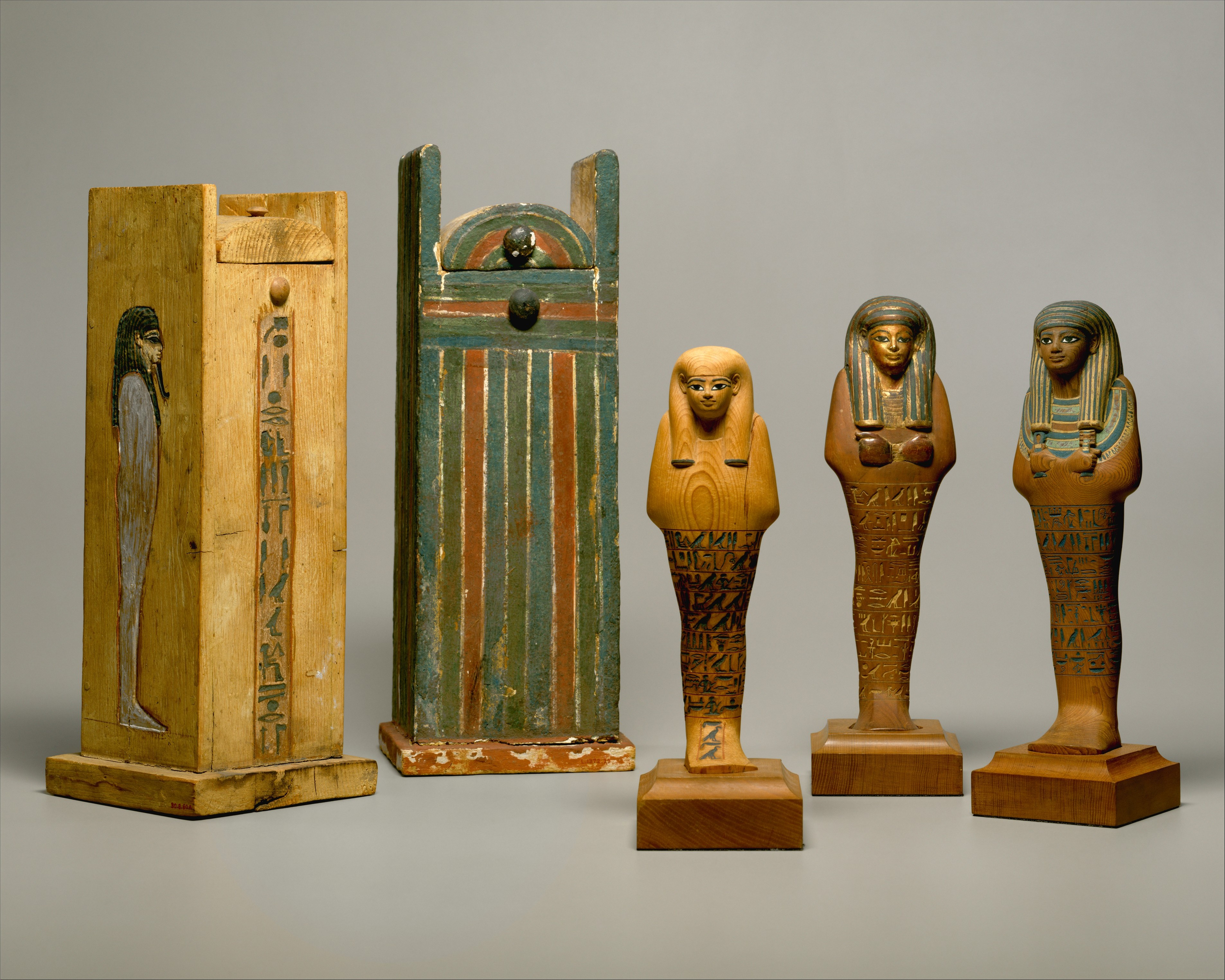
- Material: Cedar
- Size: 27 cm (10 5/8 in.)
- Writing: Egyptian hieroglyphs
- Created: ca. 1390–1352 B.C.
- Discovered: 1905
- Discovered by: Theodore M. Davis
- Present location: Metropolitan Museum of Art, New York City; Egyptian Museum, Cairo
- Classification: ushabti
- Registration: (CG51024–34. 51036, MMA30.8.56–58)
- Culture: 18th Dynasty, New Kingdom

The Ushabtis of Yuya are a set of ushabtis made for Yuya, the father of Tiye, wife of Amenhotep III, therefore grandfather of Akhenaten and great-grandfather of Tutankhamun. Discovered by Theodore M. Davis in February 1905, during his excavation of Tomb of Yuya and Thuya (also known as KV46), in the Valley of the Kings, it was among the several graves goods that was recovered from the tomb, and is considered to be among the richest and best preserved tomb before the discovery of the tomb of Tutankhamun in 1922. Yuya's ushabti was split up with 3 of them now at the Metropolitan Museum of Art and the 12 at the Egyptian Museum in Cairo.

== Description ==
The ushabtis were discovered on 5 February 1905, during the excavation of KV46, under Egyptologist James Quibell who was financed by Theodore M. Davis. The tomb itself was considered remarkable, as Yuya and Thuya were not royalty but as in-laws to royal family, they were given a spot in the Valley of the Kings. All of the ushabti, including Thuya's were recovered in the burial chamber between the Yuya's canopy and the eastern wall of tomb, in addition to two boxes containing ushabti in the southeast part of the chamber. Not all of the ushabti were in the boxes and one of them was made purely of alabaster (CG 15036) while the rest were made of wood.

The ushabtis were made of a range of materials that were considered luxurious, with varying amounts of polychromy, and a diverse array of mediums including cedar, ebony, alabaster, and copper. This is considered unusual for individuals in the 18th Dynasty, as at the time many known individuals often carried five ushabtis per owner. All ushabtis are inscribed with the Shabti Spell, or Chapter 6 of the Book of the Dead, which inscribes the ushabti to work for the deceased in the after life.

The bulk of the ushabtis, 12 of them ended up in the Egyptian Museum (Accession CG 51024–34, 51036), while Davis kept 3 of the ushabtis, and two of the boxes that they were stored in. He passed the collection on to the Metropolitan Museum of Art in 1915, when then got officially accessioned in 1930 (Accession 30.8.56-30.8.58).

On 28 January 2011, during the 2011 Egyptian revolution, the Egyptian Museum was broken into and a total of 54 objects were stolen, including 7 of the ushabti, all but one (CG 51029) were recovered but some saw damage.

== Notable Variants ==
=== CG 51025 ===
Yuya wears a tripartite wig, ears exposed, and the tips of the wig is painted yellow. He is presented with a rounded face, small mouth and a broken nose. Among the 7 stolen during the Egyptian Revolution, it suffered cracks in the front plinth, which was then subsequently restored on with an additional inlaid piece of wood to repair a split in the wig.

=== CG 51029 ===
The ushabti presents Yuya in mummiform shape, with a tripartite wig, eyes rendered in black and white, and the tips of the wig in dark blue. It was stolen during the Egyptian Revolution and has been missing ever since.

=== CG 51033 ===
Yuya is depicted with round face, small mouth and ears, and high cheekbones. The broad collar is rendered in gold leaf. The ushabti is made of a copper plate covering the wood core, the wig is made of wood and painted black, but the face is a separate copper plate from the body. Some pitting corrosion can be seen on the front and scratches are present on the wooden wig.

=== CG 51034 ===
Housed in the Egyptian Museum, Yuya is rendered in ebony in mummiform shape. His wig has vertical braids, except the end, exposing his ears. There is a hole in the chin, which used to have a false beard attached to it. Though carefully polished and carved, scratches and cracks run through it in the middle of the face, top of the wig, chin, chest, and above the right ear. Some cracks were present upon discovery though the face crack has expanded in the years since.

=== CG 51035 ===
A "magical statuette" made of cedar, measuring 25.5 cm x 9 cm x 4.5 cm. Yuya is depicted in mummiform, tripartite wig with exposed ears and collar. The eyebrows and cosmetic lines are accuented in black ink, and polychromy is largely applied to the collar. It has cracks in the chest, three fractures in the wig and left shoulder, with additional damages from its robbery during the Egyptian Revolution in 2011. After its recovery in 2014, part of its beard and lower section was broken off, but a photo subsequently supplied by Mohamed Saleh, the museum's director from 1981 to 1987, showed the statuette repaired in 2021.

Unlike the ushabti spells on the other figurines, CG 51035 has Spell 151 of the Book of the Dead, normally found of magical bricks. The text is highlighted and painted in blue. The original discovery spot in situ in Yuya's burial chamber is difficult to ascertain due to the robberies that has occurred in it in the past.

=== CG 51036 ===
Housed in the Egyptian Museum, this is the only ushabti to be made of alabaster instead of wood. In the original report by Davis, black paint was present in the eyes but is not present on present day viewing. Identify has been attributed to Yuya due to in situ findspot, despite not having a description.

=== MMA 30.8.58 ===
The MET specimen is considered the closest example to the now-missing CG 51029, the natural grain of the wood is noted, as the artist avoided covering the wood in paint. There are minor cracks on the left side, legs, and back. The Shabti spell is inked, engraved and then written in blue ink, and the last line of text is engraved vertically on the feet.
