= Throne of Princess Sitamun =

Ancient Egyptian throne

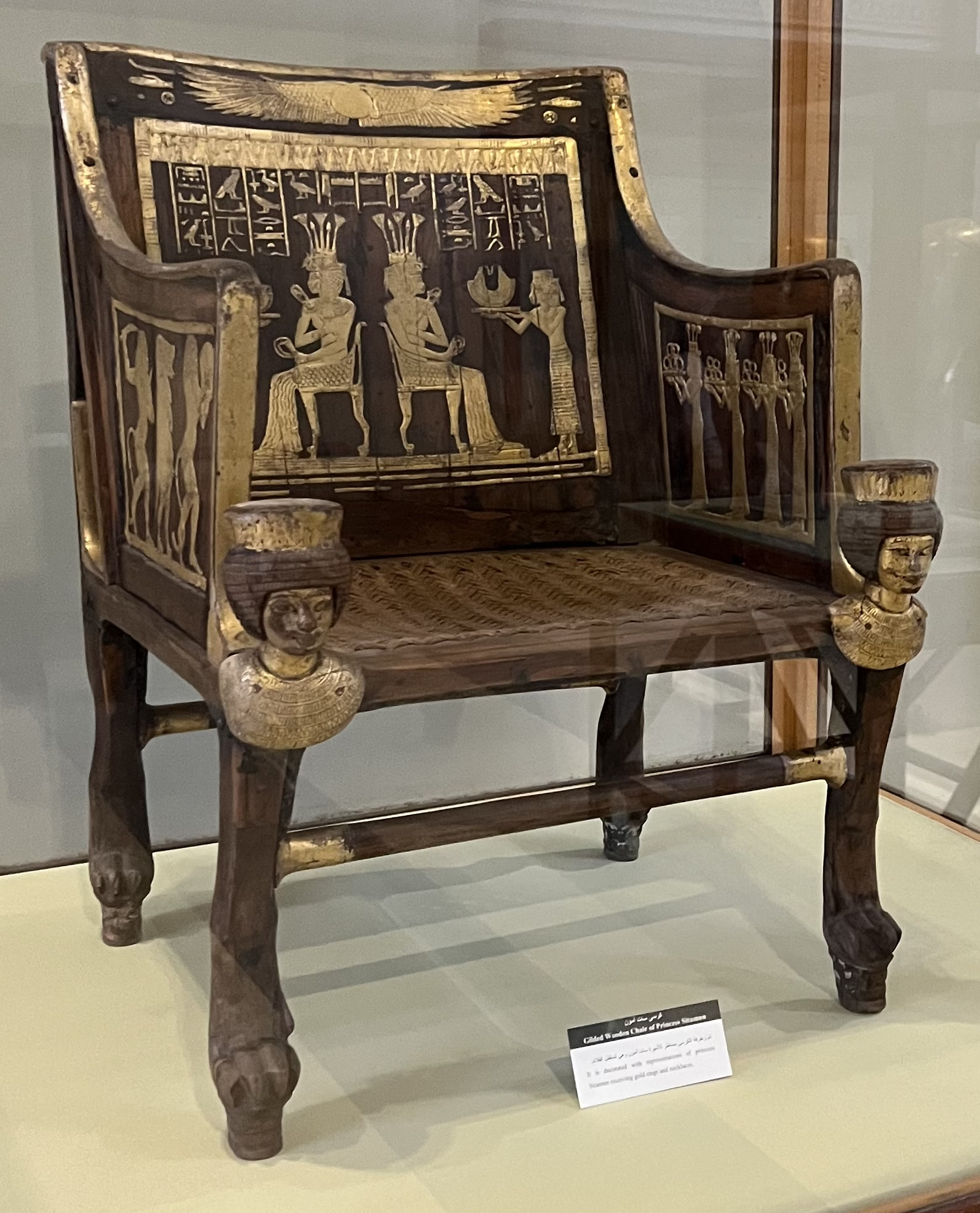
- The throne as displayed in the Egyptian Museum, Cairo
- Material: wood, partially gilt and silvered
- Size: Height:78cm; Width:54cm; Depth:63cm
- Created: 18th dynasty, New Kingdom
- Discovered: Tomb of Yuya and Thuya (KV46), Valley of the Kings
- Present location: Egyptian Museum
- Identification: JE 5342; CG 51113

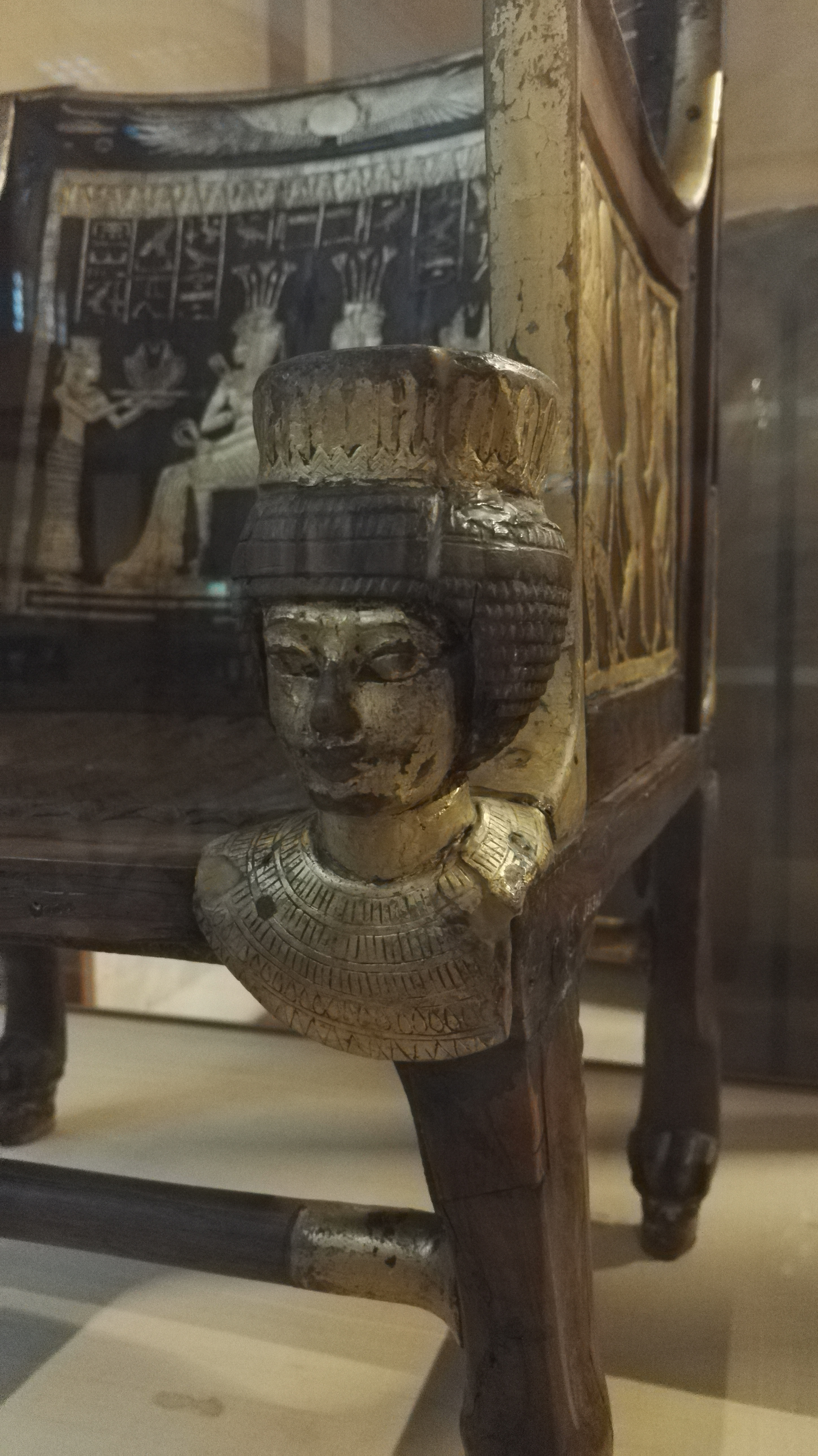
Close-up of one of the carved and gilded busts

The Throne of Princess Sitamun is an artefact from the tomb of Yuya and Thuya, which belonged to their granddaughter, Princess Sitamun, the daughter of Pharaoh Amenhotep III and Queen Tiye of the 18th Dynasty.

== Description ==
The wooden throne is an example of the subtlety and elegance of Egyptian woodwork in the 18th Dynasty. It is made from a common wood covered in parts by a 4 millimetres (0.16 in) thick veneer of a less common wood, possibly walnut. The veneer is attached by pegs.

The legs, of solid walnut, are shaped like the front and rear legs of a lion, complete with four toes and a dewclaw on the front feet. These paws sit atop high, ridged, drum bases on which traces of stucco, linen, and silver leaf survive. Cross bars which were originally silver-plated strengthen the legs. The ends of these bars are gilt and shaped like stylised papyrus umbels. A curved support strut under the seat further strengthen the frame.

The very well preserved seat is made of fine string threaded through holes in the frame; it is woven in a herringbone pattern and tied underneath. This material was still strong despite its age, as the chair supported the unexpected weight of Empress Eugenie of France, who visited the tomb during its clearance. James Quibell and Joseph Lindon Smith, the leaders of the clearance project, were too embarrassed to tell her to get up.

The high back curves around the sitter. It is supported from behind by three vertical struts running in parallel; the two outer struts were supplemented with gilt wood edging. The backrest itself is made of a frame composed of several supports into which the wood making up the back proper is set. As elsewhere it is covered by a veneer, this time carrying gilded decoration; the veneer has split and cracked. The armrests and seat frame were strengthened by gilt wood edging too which continued from the armrests up to the back of the chair. Bronze nails supplement the wooden mortise and tenon joins where the pieces of the backrest meet.

The armrests consist of a frame made of four parts and filled in by a panel of wood. The dowels and mortise and tenons are supplemented by four bronze nails on each armrest. Wooden pegs were also used to fill the knots present in the wood.

At the front of the armrests there are gilt portrait heads. They are perhaps busts of Sitamun herself. As is usual for this period, she wears a short, round, curly wig and a broad usekh collar. The crown, face and collar are all gilt; the wig was once black.

== Decoration ==
=== Backrest ===
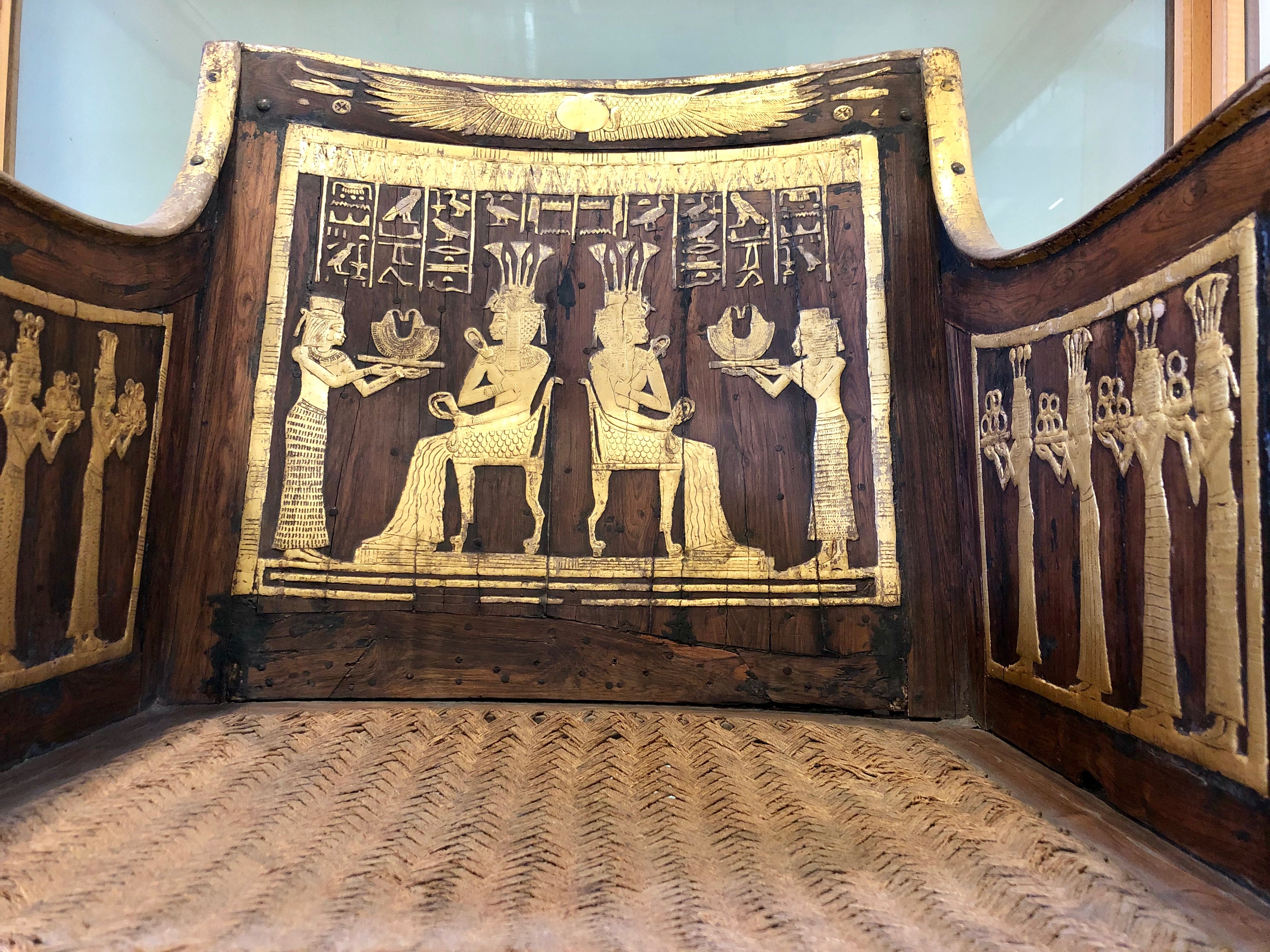
Backrest of the throne

The backside is covered in silver and decorated with a fine feather pattern, now blackened with age. The sides bear gilt decoration. On the front side there is a gilt plaster relief depicting the winged sun above a scene which centres on the princess.

The scene is doubled, showing Sitamun enthroned before a young woman bringing gifts. She is seated in a chair with a high back and lion legs; the low armrests are decorated with a feather pattern. Her feet sit on a footstool or flat cushion. She wears a short curly wig and the typical sidelock of Egyptian royal youth, set off by a large earring. On her head she wears a diadem, tied in the back, featuring a gazelle at the brow, and is crowned by a modius topped by three tall lotus blooms and buds. She wears a broad usekh collar, as well as bracelets on her arms. She is clothed in a tight-fitting garment of closely pleated linen, stretching down to her ankles. In her hands she holds a sistrum and menat – typical attributes of princesses and singers in the cult of Hathor. Both of the women bearing gifts are identical in appearance and costume, wearing half length wigs with an angular cut, headbands, crowns, bracelets, earrings, and broad collars. They wear tight vests, belts, and long skirts decorated with horizontal bands. They present a wide golden usekh collar to the princess on a tray. The scene is topped by a frieze of lotus blooms. Above the figures an inscription which names Sitamun as "the eldest daughter of the king whom he loves" and the presentation of the collar is captioned "offering gold of the lands of the South." The whole scene is edged by a frame.

=== Armrests ===
The inner sides of the armrests continue the scene on the backrest, depicting a procession of four women carrying stacks of gold rings, all crowned with tall headdresses of lotus flowers. Their ornaments and the shape of their long dresses vary from one another, otherwise their appearance mimics that of the servants in the main scene on the back of the chair.

The outside of the right armrest shows the goddess Taweret with two figures of the god Bes. Taweret is depicted in the form of a hippopotamus with sagging breasts, a crocodile's back and a lion's paws. All figures have randomly dotted fur. One of the figures of Bes swings two knives, the other plays the tambourine. The left armrest shows Bes three times, again with knives and a tambourine. The gods Taweret and Bes served as defense from evil forces, guaranteeing health and long life. Taweret was a goddess of fertility, pregnancy and birth. Both deities were regularly depicted on beds, headrests and chairs in the 18th dynasty.

== Purpose ==
Given the wear of the gold leaf on the backrest, the moulding of the armrests and the ornamental portrait heads, it is thought that the chair was used on a day-to-day basis. But in addition it was also a piece of ceremonial furniture. The scenes depicting a gift of gold probably refer to the first Nehebkau festival of Amenhotep III. Walter Segal suggested in his examination of the chair that the bronze nails were added only after it became consigned to the tomb.

== Bibliography ==
- Geoffrey Killen. Ancient Egyptian furniture / (Vol) I, 4000–1300 BC (Vol) II, Boxes, chests and footstools. Aris & Phillips, Warminster 1994., ISBN 0-85668-095-8, pp. 51–63.
- Marianne Eaton-Krauss. "Walter Segal’s Documentation of CG 51113, the Throne of Princess Sat-Amun." The Journal of Egyptian Archaeology. 75. 1989, pp. 77–88.
- Klaus-Peter Kuhlmann. "Der Thron im alten Ägypten. Untersuchungen zu Semantik, Ikonographie und Symbolik eines Herrschaftszeichens." ADAIK. 10, 1977, p. 88 with n. 5.
- Nicholas Reeves, Richard H. Wilkinson. The Complete Valley of the Kings. Tombs and Treasures of Egypt's Greatest Pharaohs. Thames & Hudson, 1996, ISBN 0-500-05080-5, p. 178.
- Dan Svarth. Egyptisk møbelkunst fra faraotiden. Skippershoved, Skårup 1998, ISBN 87-89224-39-6, pp. 64–85.
- André Wiese, Andreas Brodbeck, Andreas F. Voegelin, Andrea Maria Gnirs. Tutanchamun – Das goldene Jenseits. Grabschätze aus dem Tal der Könige. Hirmer, München 2004, ISBN 3-7774-2065-4, pp. 196–201.
