= Annie Abernethie Pirie Quibell =

British artist and archaeologist

- Born: 1862; Aberdeenshire
- Died: 1927 (aged 64–65); England
- Education: Royal Scottish Academy University College London
- Occupations: Artist & Archaeologist
- Known for: Egyptian archaeology

Annie Abernethy Pirie Quibell (1862–1927) was a British artist and archaeologist.

== Early life and education ==
Annie Abernethy Pirie Quibell was born in 1862 in Aberdeenshire. Her father was minister and Principal at the University of Aberdeen. As a young woman, she originally trained as an artist and her work was exhibited at the Royal Scottish Academy.

She was one of Flinders Petrie's earliest students, in the 1890s, at University College London. At the time, this was the only university in the UK which allowed women to earn degrees. She would have been in the classroom with Margaret Alice Murray, and likely taught by Francis Llewellyn Griffith.

== Career ==
In 1895, Pirie was chosen by Petrie to join his field team in Egypt at Saqqara and the Ramesseum, Thebes. She went to work as a copyist with another artist Rosalind Frances Emily Paget. At Saqqara they worked in the Fifth Dynasty tomb of Ptahhotep.

She was a part of the excavation team at El Kab in 1897, and Hierakonpolis the following year and continued working in excavations in Egypt with her husband, James Edward Quibell, whom she met in Egypt and married in 1900. They first fell in love while both were suffering from a bout of ptomaine poisoning from eating bad food while on excavation. They ultimately worked together at Saqqara for eight years from 1905 to 1914. Her illustrations of archaeological finds were featured in archaeological reports on Saqqara, the Ramesseum and Hierakonpolis.

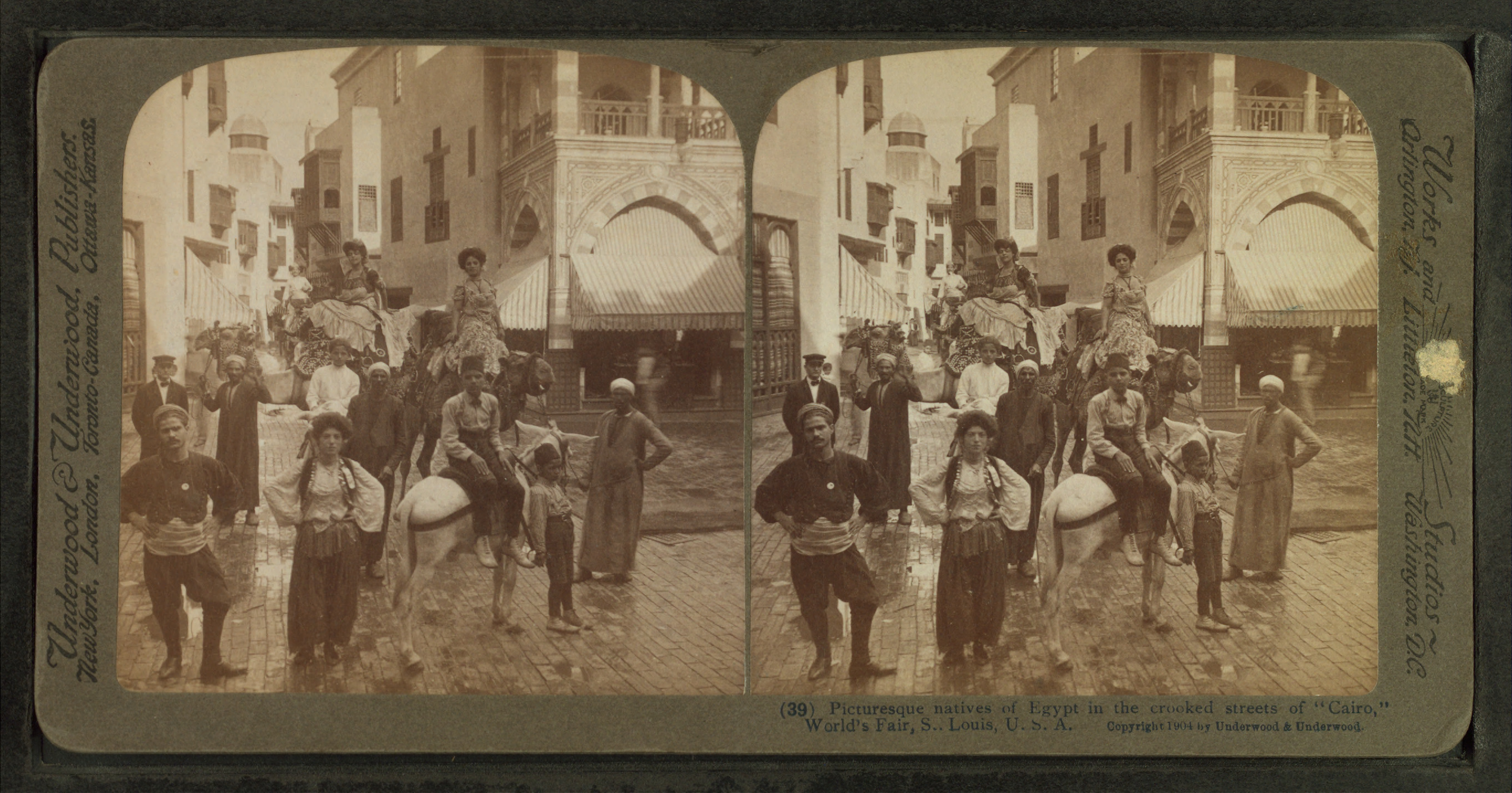
Part of the Egyptian Exhibit at the World's Fair.

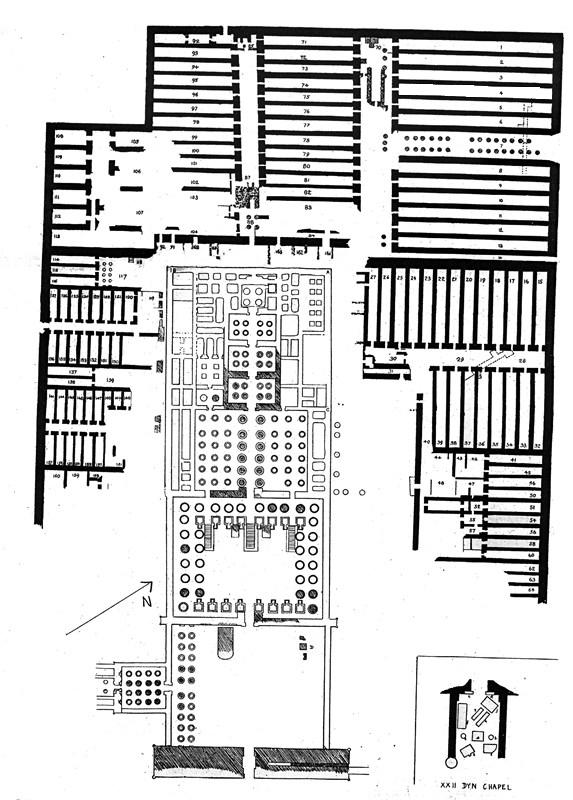
Ramesseum plan by J. E. Quibell. Annie worked on this site with James early on.

Quibell and her husband curated the Egyptian exhibit for the 1904 St. Louis World's Fair.

Annie Quibell was also an author, as well as an artist. Her first publication was an English translation of the Guide to the Cairo Museum in 1906, co-authored with her husband. She produced short guides to the Pyramids at Giza and the Saqqara tombs which were originally published in Cairo. In the 1920s, she published two books, Egyptian History and Art (1923), and A Wayfarer in Egypt (1925). After her return to Britain, she worked on arranging the Egyptian gallery at the Marischal Museum at Aberdeen University.

== Death and legacy ==
Annie Pirie Quibell died in England in 1927 of leukaemia, when she was 65 years old. Her husband and her friends were shocked by this death, and he never fully recovered. Annie's archaeological drawings are still used by researchers and students, and can be viewed at the Ancient Egypt Rediscovered Gallery of the National Museum of Scotland.

== Published works ==
- Maspero, Gaston C. C, James E. Quibell, and Annie A. Quibell. Guide to the Cairo Museum. Cairo: Printing Office of the French Institute of Oriental Archaeology, 1910.
- Quibell, Annie A. The Pyramids of Giza. Cairo: CMS Bookshop, 1915.
- Quibell, Annie A. P. Some Notes on Egyptian History & Art: With Reference to the Collections in Cairo Museum. Cairo: C.M.S. Bookshop, 1919.
- Quibell, Annie A. P. Egyptian History and Art: With Reference to Museum Collections. London: Society for Promoting Christian Knowledge, 1923.
- Quibell, Annie A. P. A Wayfarer in Egypt. London: Methuen, 1939.
