= KV3 =

Ancient Egyptian tomb in the Valley of the Kings

- Burial site of Unnamed son of Ramesses III
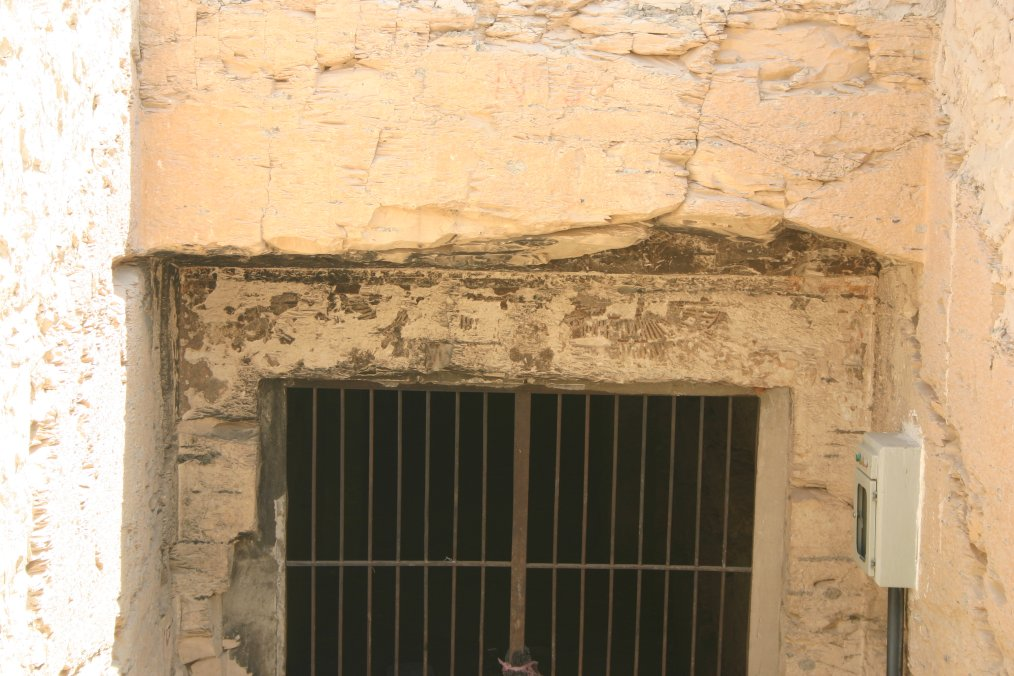
- KV3 entrance

- Location within Egypt
- Coordinates: 25°44′27.5″N 32°36′09.5″E
- Location: East Valley of the Kings
- Discovered: Open in antiquity
- Excavated by: Edward Ayrton (1904–1906); Harry Burton (1912)
- Decoration: Rameses III followed by a prince, before various deities.
- Layout: Straight axis
- ← Previous; KV2 Next → KV4

Tomb KV3, located in Egypt's Valley of the Kings, was intended for the burial of an unidentified son of Pharaoh Ramesses III during the early part of the Twentieth Dynasty. It is similar in design to the "straight axis" tombs typical of this dynasty, and an ostracon written in hieratic script from the time of Ramesses III mentions the founding of a tomb for a royal prince, likely this tomb. The unfinished state of a couple of rooms in the tomb along with scant archeological evidence suggests that the tomb was never used. Some have suggested that it was originally intended for use by the prince regent who would succeed as Ramesses IV, and who started building his own tomb (KV2) soon after he came to the throne.

== Tomb description ==
In terms of its design it closely follows that used for tombs in the Valley of the Queens, and its size reflects the effort that would have gone into burying a member of the royal family. The tomb is located on the main path, close to the entrance to the Valley.

Past the entrance to the tomb, KV3 barely descends any further, a particular feature for other tombs built for other sons of Ramesses III in the Valley of the Queens. There are two corridors (labeled "A" and "B") which lead from the opening to the tomb, with the second passage flanked near the end by two chambers. Of these two chambers, only the one facing south ("Bb") was finished, the other one ("Ba") being only just begun when work on the tomb was abandoned. Past the second corridor is a larger room ("F") containing four pillars, and flanked by two smaller rooms.

Only the side chamber to the north ("Fa") was finished, with work on the second one ("Fb") only just begun when work stopped. Past this room and running along the same axis as the corridor are three further rooms ("G", "H" and "I"), the first two of which have vaulted ceilings. One of these two final vaulted chambers was likely intended as a burial chamber.

What tomb decoration that survives can be found only along the length and flanking gates on either end of corridor B. These show Rameses III followed by an unnamed prince, attended by various gods and goddesses. It is thought that more decoration once existed, since Karl Lepsius noted traces of paint on the vaulted chambers and mentions cartouches and images of Ramesses III in the first corridor when he visited the tomb in the 1840s.

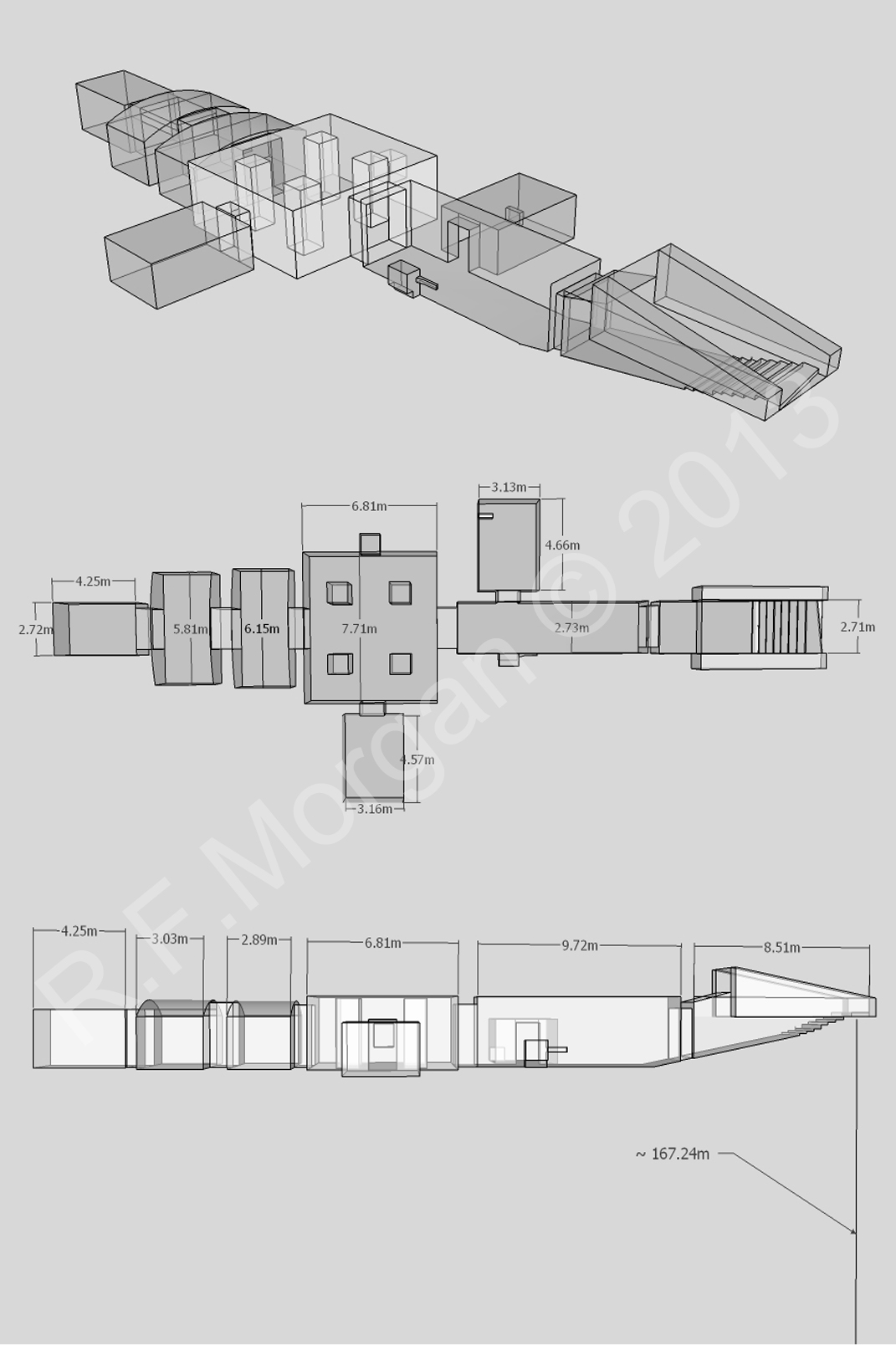
Isometric, plan and elevation of KV3

There is evidence that in the Byzantine period the tomb was used as a Christian chapel.

Though open since Ancient times, the tomb was only properly excavated in 1912 by archeologist Harry Burton, which was funded by the wealthy American lawyer Theodore M. Davis. It was one of the last excavations funded by Davis, and no report of this excavation work was published.
