= James Quibell =

British Egyptologist

- Portrait of James Quibell
- Born: 11 November 1867; Newport, Shropshire, England
- Died: 5 June 1935 (aged 67)
- Known for: Discovery of the Narmer Palette (1898); Discovery of tomb of Yuya and Thuya (1905)
- Scientific career
- Fields: Egyptology

James Edward Quibell (11 November 1867 – 5 June 1935) was a British Egyptologist.

== Life ==
Quibell was born in Newport, Shropshire. He married the Scottish artist and archaeologist Annie Abernethie Pirie in 1900.

He was educated at Adams' Grammar School in Newport and Christ Church, Oxford. He became fascinated by the antiquities, and offered himself as a pupil to Professor Flinders Petrie, with whom he worked at Coptos in 1893, then at Nagada, Ballas, Thebes, El Kab, and Hierakonpolis in successive years, including the Ramesseum. He also assisted Cecil Firth in his excavations in Saqqara. Between 1899 and 1904, he also served as chief inspector of antiquities for the Delta and Middle Egypt (Howard Carter, who was chief inspector at Luxor was his opposite). Later, between 1904 and 1905, he was appointed as chief inspector at Saqqara. Between 1914 and 1923, he was a keeper in the Cairo Museum, and served as director of excavations at the Djoser Step Pyramid between 1931 and 1935.

After six months' study at the Humboldt University of Berlin he was appointed to the Catalogue Commission of the Egyptian Museum, and in 1899 as an inspector on the staff of the Antiquities Department, a colleague being Howard Carter.

He worked at Saqqara, in the Valley of the Kings (where he discovered the tomb of Yuya and Thuya in 1905), and at Hierakonpolis (ancient Nekhen), where amongst other discoveries his team found the Narmer Palette in 1898 and the Main Deposit. In 1898 he was made an inspector of the Antiquities Service for the Delta and Middle Egyptian regions. He later served as director of the Egyptian Museum from 1914 to 1923 and secretary-general of the Antiquities Service until 1925 when he retired.

== See also ==
- List of Egyptologists
