= Exploration of the Valley of the Kings =

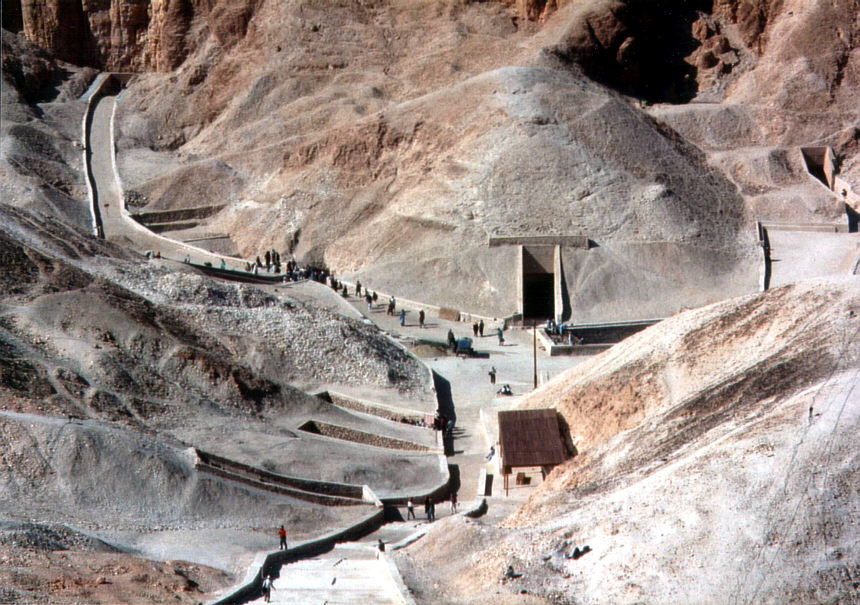
View of the central East Valley, showing area around KV62

The area of the Valley of the Kings, in Luxor, Egypt, has been a major area of modern Egyptological exploration for the last two centuries. Before this, the area was a site for tourism in antiquity (especially during Roman times). This area illustrates the changes in the study of ancient Egypt, beginning as antiquity hunting and ending with the scientific excavation of the whole Theban Necropolis. Despite the exploration and investigation noted below, only eleven of the tombs have actually been completely recorded.

The Greek writers Strabo (1st century BC) and Diodorus Siculus (1st century AD) reported that the total number of Theban royal tombs was 47; at the time, only 17 were believed to be undestroyed. Pausanias and other ancient writers remarked on the pipe-like corridors of the Valley, meaning the tombs.

Many of the tombs contain graffiti written by these ancient tourists. Jules Baillet located over 2100 Greek and Latin graffiti, along with a smaller number in Phoenician, Cypriot, Lycian, Coptic, and other languages. The majority of the ancient graffiti are found in KV9, which contains just under a thousand of them. The earliest positively dated graffiti dates to 278 BC.

== Eighteenth century ==
Before the 19th century, travel from Europe to Thebes (and indeed anywhere in Egypt) was difficult, time-consuming and expensive: only the hardiest of European travelers visited—indeed, before the travels of Father Claude Sicard in 1726, it was unclear just where Thebes really was. It was known to be on the Nile, but it was often confused with Memphis and several other sites. One of the first travelers to record what he saw at Thebes was Frederic Louis Norden, a Danish adventurer and artist. He was followed by Richard Pococke, who published the first modern map of the valley itself, in 1743.

French Expedition

In 1799, Napoleon's expedition (especially Dominique Vivant) drew maps and plans of the known tombs, and for the first time, noted the Western Valley (where Prosper Jollois and Édouard de Villiers du Terrage located the tomb of Amenhotep III, WV22). The Description de l'Égypte contains two volumes (out a total of 24) on the area around Thebes.

== Nineteenth century ==
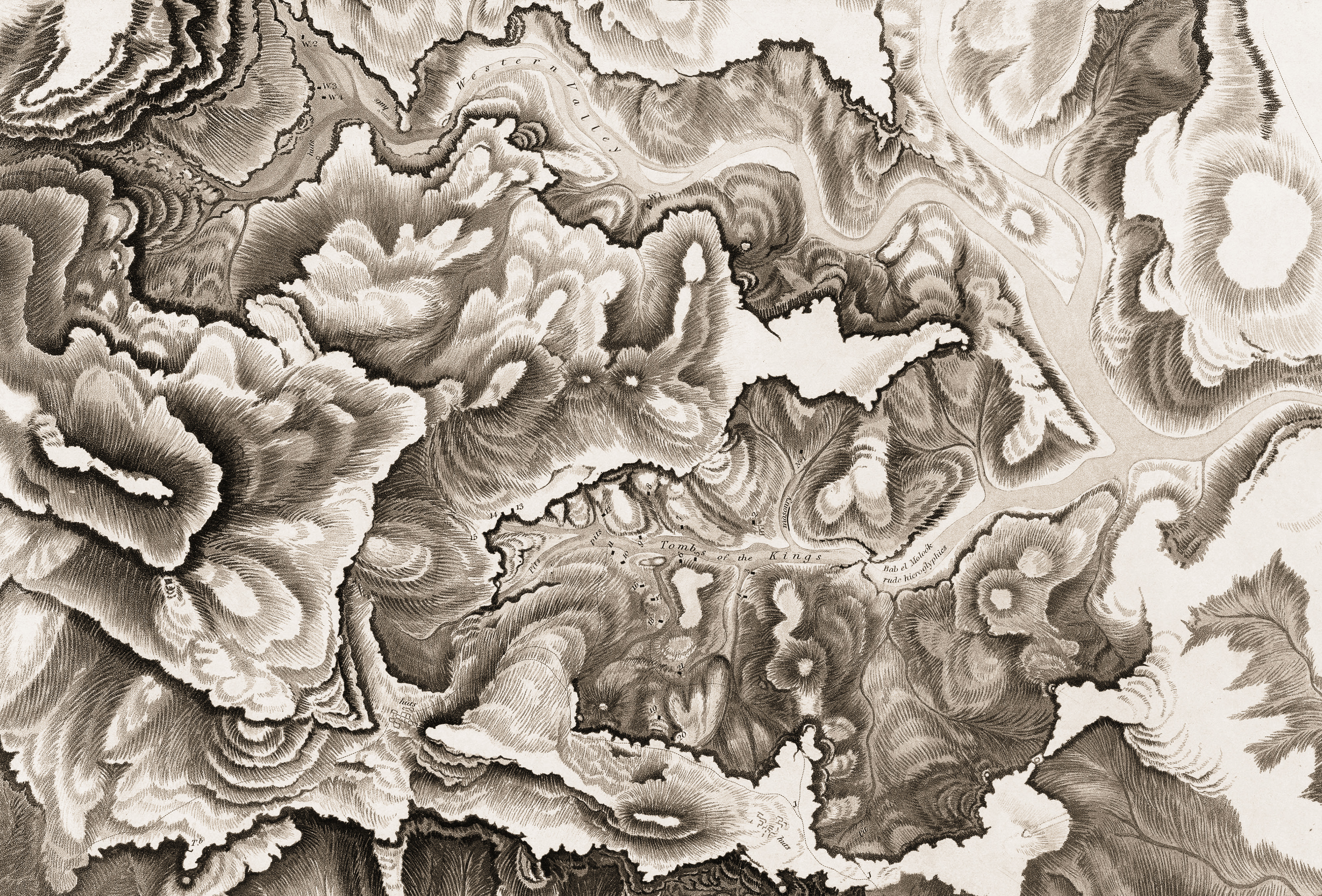
John Gardner Wilkinson's numbering system for the tombs, which remains in use today

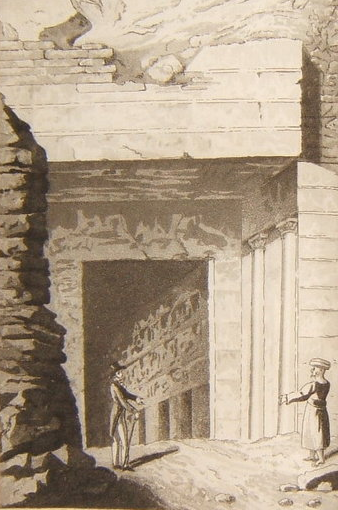
Entrance to a Royal Tomb, drawn in 1821

European exploration continued in the area around Thebes during the 19th century, boosted by Champollion's translation of hieroglyphs early in the century. Early in the century, the area was visited by Belzoni, working for Henry Salt, who discovered several tombs, including those of Ay in the West Valley (WV23) in 1816 and Seti I (KV17) the next year. At the end of his visits, Belzoni declared that all of the tombs had been found, and nothing of note remained to be found. Working at the same time (and a great rival of Belzoni and Salt) was Bernardino Drovetti, the French Consul-General.

In 1827, John Gardiner Wilkinson was assigned to paint the entry of every tomb, giving them each a designation that is still in use today—they were numbered from KV1 to KV21, with KV standing for King's Valley, (although the maps show 28 entrances, some of which were unexplored). These paintings and maps were later published in The Topography of Thebes and General Survey of Egypt, in 1830. At the same time James Burton explored the valley. His works included making KV17 safer from flooding, although, he is better known for entering KV5.

Champollion himself visited the valley along with Ippolito Rosellini and Nestor L'Hôte, in the Franco-Tuscan Expedition of 1829. The expedition spent two months studying the open tombs, visiting about 16 of them in total. They copied the inscriptions and identified the original tomb owners. In tomb KV17, they removed wall decorations, which are now on display in the Louvre in Paris.

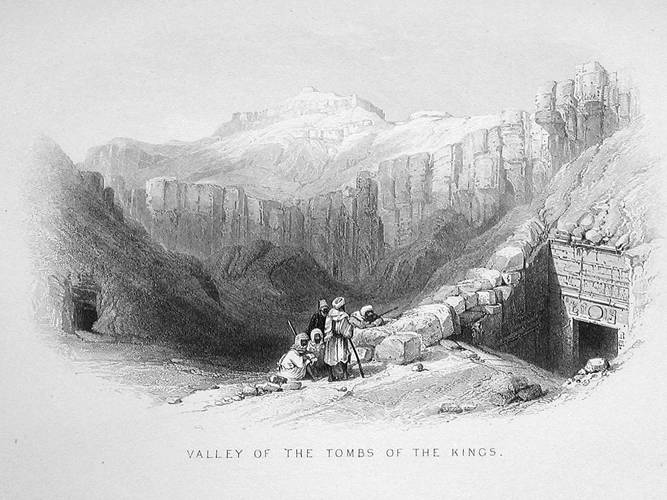
Drawing of the valley showing open tombs from 1862

In 1845–1846 the valley was explored by Karl Richard Lepsius's expedition; they explored and documented twenty-five in the main valley and four in the west.

The second half of the century saw a more concerted effort to preserve rather than simply gathering antiquities. Auguste Mariette's Egyptian Antiquities Service started to explore the valley, first with Eugène Lefébure in 1883, then Jules Baillet and Georges Bénédite in early 1888, and finally Victor Loret in 1898 to 1899. Loret added a further 16 tombs to the list, and explored several tombs that had already been discovered. During this time Georges Daressy explored KV9.

When Gaston Maspero was reappointed to head the Egyptian Antiquities Service, the nature of the exploration of the valley changed again. Maspero appointed Howard Carter as the Chief Inspector of Upper Egypt, and the young man discovered several new tombs, and explored several others, clearing KV42 and KV20.

== Twentieth century ==
Around the turn of the 20th century, the American Theodore M. Davis had the excavation permit in the valley, and his team (led mostly by Edward R. Ayrton) discovered several royal and non-royal tombs (including KV43, KV46 and KV57). In 1907 they discovered the possible Amarna Period cache in KV55. After finding what they thought was all that remained of the burial of Tutankhamun (items recovered from KV54 and KV58), it was announced that the valley was completely explored and no further burials were to be found, in Davis's 1912 publication, The Tombs of Harmhabi and Touatânkhamanou; the book closes with the comment, "I fear that the Valley of Kings is now exhausted."

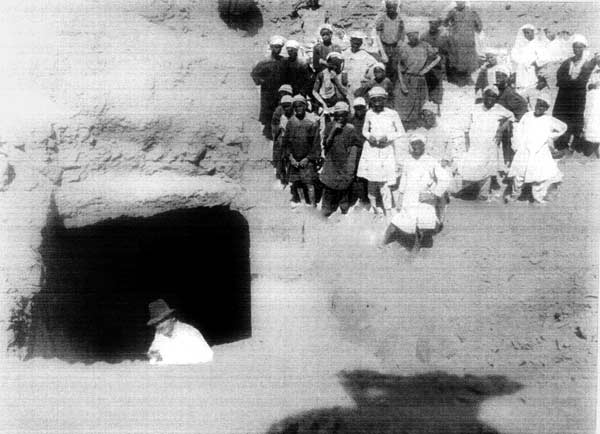
Entrance to Horemheb's tomb, soon after discovery in 1908

After Davis's death early in 1915 Lord Carnarvon acquired the concession to excavate the valley and he employed Carter to explore it. After a systematic search they discovered the actual tomb of Tutankhamun (KV62) in November 1922.

At the end of the century, the Theban Mapping Project re-discovered and explored tomb KV5, which has since been discovered to be probably the largest in the valley (having at least 120 rooms) and was the burial for the sons of Ramesses II. Elsewhere in the eastern and western branches of the valley, several other expeditions cleared and studied other tombs. Until 2002 the Amarna Royal Tombs Project explored the area around KV55 and KV62, the Amarna Period tombs in the main valley.

== Twenty-first century ==
Various expeditions have continued to explore the valley, adding greatly to the knowledge of the area. In 2001 the Theban Mapping Project designed new signs for the tombs, providing information and plans of the open tombs.

On February 8, 2006, the Supreme Council of Antiquities announced that an American team led by the University of Memphis had uncovered a pharaonic-era tomb (KV63), the first uncovered there since King Tutankhamun's in 1922. The 18th Dynasty tomb included five intact sarcophagi with coloured funerary masks along with 28 large storage jars, sealed with pharaonic seals. It is located close to the tomb of Tutankhamun. KV63, as it is known, appears to be a single chamber with seven sarcophagi, and about 20 large funerary jars. The chamber is from the 18th dynasty and it appears to have been a deposit of funerary preparation materials, rather than a tomb. As yet, no mummies have been discovered in the sarcophagi, and it is now thought of as a mummification chamber rather than a tomb.

On July 31, 2006, Nicholas Reeves announced that analysis of ground penetrating radar for the autumn of 2000 showed a sub-surface anomaly in the area of KV62 and KV63. He has tentatively labeled this anomaly "KV64". This has caused some controversy, as only Egypt's Supreme Council of Antiquities can officially designate the name of a new tomb, the anomaly may not in fact be a tomb, and because Reeves had reported the finding to the press first, instead of a scientific paper.

In May 2008, Zahi Hawass announced that an Egyptian team has been looking for the tomb of Ramesses VIII, concentrating around the tombs of Merenptah and Ramesses II. In August 2008, it was announced that two further tomb entrances had been located, and these would be investigated in October 2008. At the same time, clearance of the descending tunnel in KV17 has started.
