= Nehmes Bastet =

Egyptian priestess (c. 945–712 BCE)

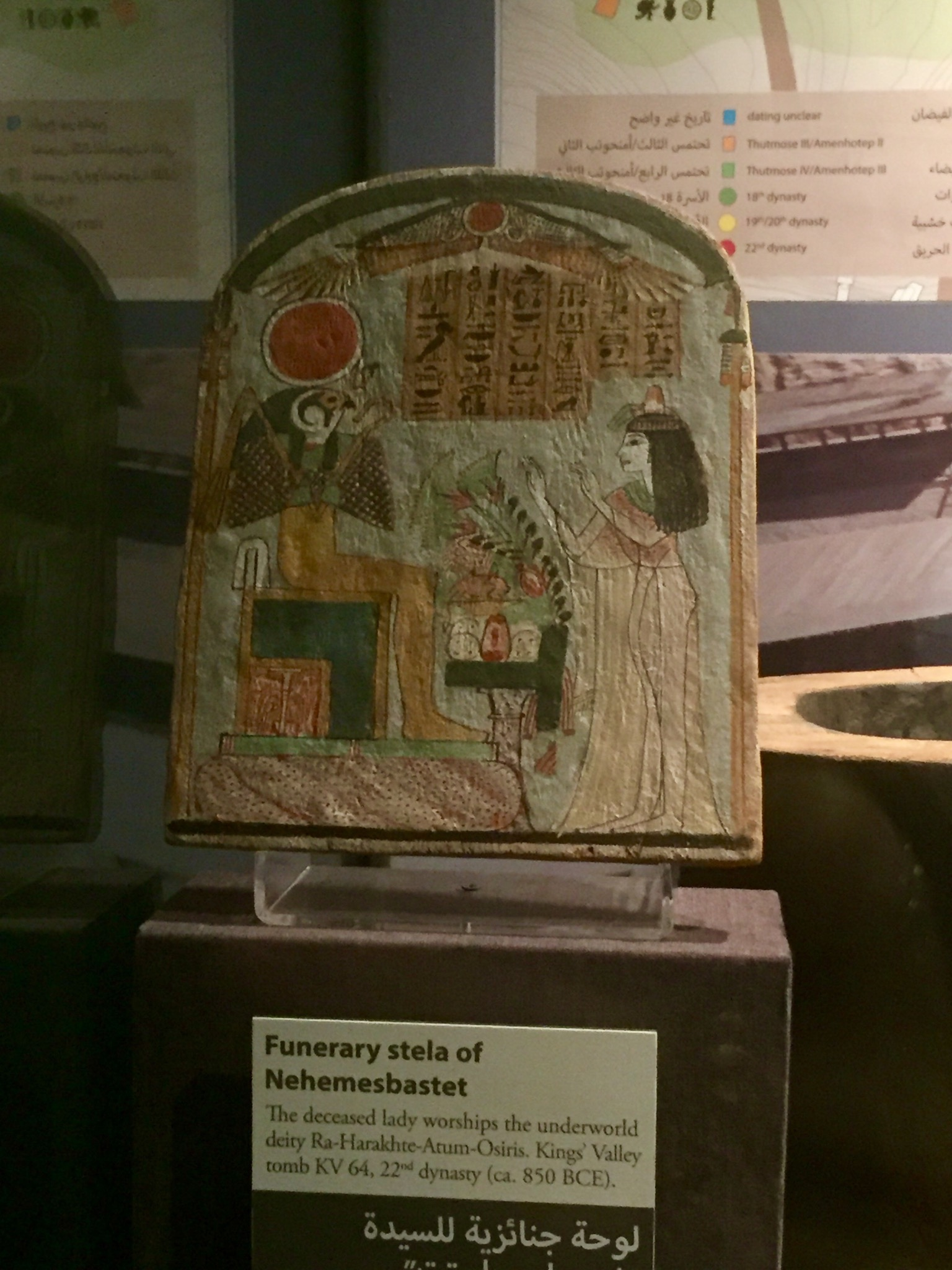
Stela depicting Nehmes Bastet worshipping the composite funerary deity Ra-Horakhty-Atum-Osiris

Nehmes Bastet or Nehemes-Bastet was an Ancient Egyptian priestess who held the office of "chantress"; she was the daughter of the high priest of Amun. She lived during the Twenty-second Dynasty (approximately 945–712 BC) and was buried in tomb KV64 in the Valley of the Kings. It was excavated in 2012 and discovered to be a reuse of a tomb for the burial of a woman of an earlier dynasty, whose name, as yet, is unknown.

According to an inscription on her coffin, she was the daughter of Nakhtefmut, the high priest of Amun who held the office of "the Opener of the Doors of Heaven" at Karnak, an important temple during that dynasty. A wooden stela that accompanied her burial depicts Nehmes Bastet worshiping before a composite deity with attributes of both a sun-god and the god Osiris.

== Burial ==
On 25 January 2011, the upper edge of the shaft of KV64 was discovered and the tomb was excavated and described in 2012 by Dr. Susanne Bickel and Dr. Elina Paulin-Grothe, a team from University of Basel in Switzerland. Her funerary stele and intact coffin containing her wrapped mummy were found sitting on top of a layer of fill at the far end of the chamber. Her coffin is constructed from sycamore wood with acacia pegs and is covered with yellow decoration on a black background.

== See also ==
- KV63
- KV65
