= Nicholas Reeves =

British Egyptologist

- Born: Carl Nicholas Reeves; 28 September 1956 (age 69)
- Education: University College London; Durham University
- Known for: Archaeological and historical work on the Amarna Period and the Valley of the Kings
- Scientific career
- Fields: Egyptology and archaeology
- Workplaces: University of Arizona Egyptian Expedition; Metropolitan Museum of Art; Myers Museum, Eton College; Chiddingstone Castle; Highclere Castle (for The 7th Earl of Carnarvon); British Museum; Society of Antiquaries of London; Durham University; University College London

Carl Nicholas Reeves, FSA (born 28 September 1956), is a British Egyptologist, archaeologist and museum curator.

== Background ==
A specialist in Egyptian history and material culture, Reeves is a graduate (first class honours) in Ancient History from University College London (1979). He received his Ph.D. in Egyptology from Durham University in 1984 for a dissertation entitled Studies in the Archaeology of the Valley of the Kings, with Particular Reference to Tomb Robbery and the Caching of the Royal Mummies.

He was elected a Fellow of the Society of Antiquaries of London in 1994, and an Honorary Fellow of the Oriental Museum, Durham University in 1996. Between 1998 and 2004 he was Honorary Research Fellow in the Institute of Archaeology, University College London, and in 2010/2011 Sylvan C Coleman and Pamela Coleman Memorial Fellow in the Department of Egyptian Art, The Metropolitan Museum of Art, New York.

== Museums ==
Reeves has been active in various museum and heritage roles, including: Curator in the former Department of Egyptian Antiquities at the British Museum (initiating the Survey of Egyptian Collections in the UK - now an important component of the Museums, Libraries and Archives Council Cornucopia database) (1984–1991); Curator to Henry Herbert, 7th Earl of Carnarvon at Highclere Castle (1988–1998); Curatorial Consultant on Egyptian antiquities to the Freud Museum, London 1986–2006); Honorary Curator and Director of Collections for the Denys Eyre Bower Bequest at Chiddingstone Castle, Kent (1995–2002 and 2003–2007); G.A.D. Tait Curator of Egyptian and Classical Art at Eton College (2000–2010); Lila Acheson Wallace Associate Curator of Egyptian Art, The Metropolitan Museum of Art, New York (2011–2014).

== Archaeology ==
Between 1998 and 2002 Reeves worked in the field as Director of the Amarna Royal Tombs Project in Egypt's Valley of the Kings, undertaking four seasons of survey and excavation with an international team in search of evidence for the missing burials of the women of Akhenaten's court. The first stratigraphic excavation of the Valley ever attempted, among the features pinpointed (during the project's 2000 radar survey) was KV63, subsequently excavated by Otto Schaden then working for the University of Memphis. The project was re-initiated in 2014, then as part of the University of Arizona Egyptian Expedition.

== Exploration of Tutankhamun's tomb ==
In a non-peer reviewed paper published in July, 2015 on self-publishing platform "academia.edu," Reeves drew attention to distinct linear traces visible in high-resolution surface scans of the painted surfaces of the Burial Chamber within Tutankhamun's tomb. He argued that these traces represent the "ghosts" of two hitherto unrecognized doorways likely to give access to: (1) a still unexplored storage chamber on the west, seemingly contemporary with the stocking of Tutankhamun's burial; and (2) a pre-Tutankhamun continuation of KV 62 towards the north. Subsequent research has allegedly confirmed KV 62's basic, queenly plan and the north wall scene's Amarna proportions and diagnostic facial details; the discovery of palimpsest inscriptions further supports the view that the tomb continues, specifically to the burial apartments beyond of Nefertiti (interred as Akhenaten's successor Smenkhkare), KV 62's original and presumably still-present owner.

== Other activities ==
Reeves has organized or been intimately involved in several major exhibitions of Egyptian, Classical and Oriental art - at the British Museum, London, the Metropolitan Museum of Art in New York, the Rijksmuseum van Oudheden in Leiden, the Roemer- und Pelizaeus-Museum in Hildesheim, the Centro Cultural Conde Duque in Madrid, the Musée des Arts Décoratifs in Bordeaux, and several venues throughout Japan.

He has organized two international conferences: After Tutankhamun: an International Conference on the Valley of the Kings (Highclere Castle, 1990); and The Amarna Royal Tombs Project 1998–2001 (University College London, 2001).

Dedicated television documentaries on Reeves' work have been aired by The Learning Channel (Nefertiti, Egypt's Mysterious Queen, 1999) and Tokyo Broadcasting System (TBS) (Missing Queen of the Sun, 2002).

== Publications ==
Reeves has published many academic articles and several well-received books, including:

- Valley of the Kings: The Decline of a Royal Necropolis
- The Complete Tutankhamun ISBN 9780500052167
- Howard Carter: Before Tutankhamun (with John H. Taylor)
- The Complete Valley of the Kings (with Richard H. Wilkinson)
- Ancient Egypt: The Great Discoveries
- Akhenaten: Egypt's False Prophet ISBN 9780500051061
- The Burial of Nefertiti?
- The Decorated North Wall in the Tomb of Tutankhamun (KV 62) (The Burial of Nefertiti? II) (with a contribution by George Ballard)
- The Tomb of Tutankhamun (KV 62) (The Burial of Nefertiti? III) (with computer animations by Peter Gremse)

Reeves has also co-authored a children's book, entitled Into the Mummy's Tomb: The Real-life Discovery of Tutankhamun's Treasures.

== See also ==
- Valley of the Kings
- KV63
- KV64
- Smenkhkare
