= KV64 =

Ancient Egyptian tomb discovered in 2011

- Burial site of Unknown, Nehmes Bastet
- Location within Egypt
- Coordinates: 25°44′24.6″N 32°36′04.7″E
- Location: East Valley of the Kings
- Discovered: 25 January 2011
- Excavated by: University of Basel (2012–13)
- Layout: Shaft and chamber
- ← Previous; KV63 Next → KV65

KV64 is the tomb of an unknown Eighteenth Dynasty individual in the Valley of the Kings, near Luxor, Egypt that was re-used in the Twenty-second Dynasty for the burial of the priestess Nehmes Bastet, who held the office of "chantress" at the temple of Karnak. The tomb is located on the pathway to KV34 (tomb of Thutmose III) in the main Valley of the Kings. KV64 was discovered in 2011 and excavated in 2012 by Susanne Bickel and Elina Paulin-Grothe of the University of Basel.

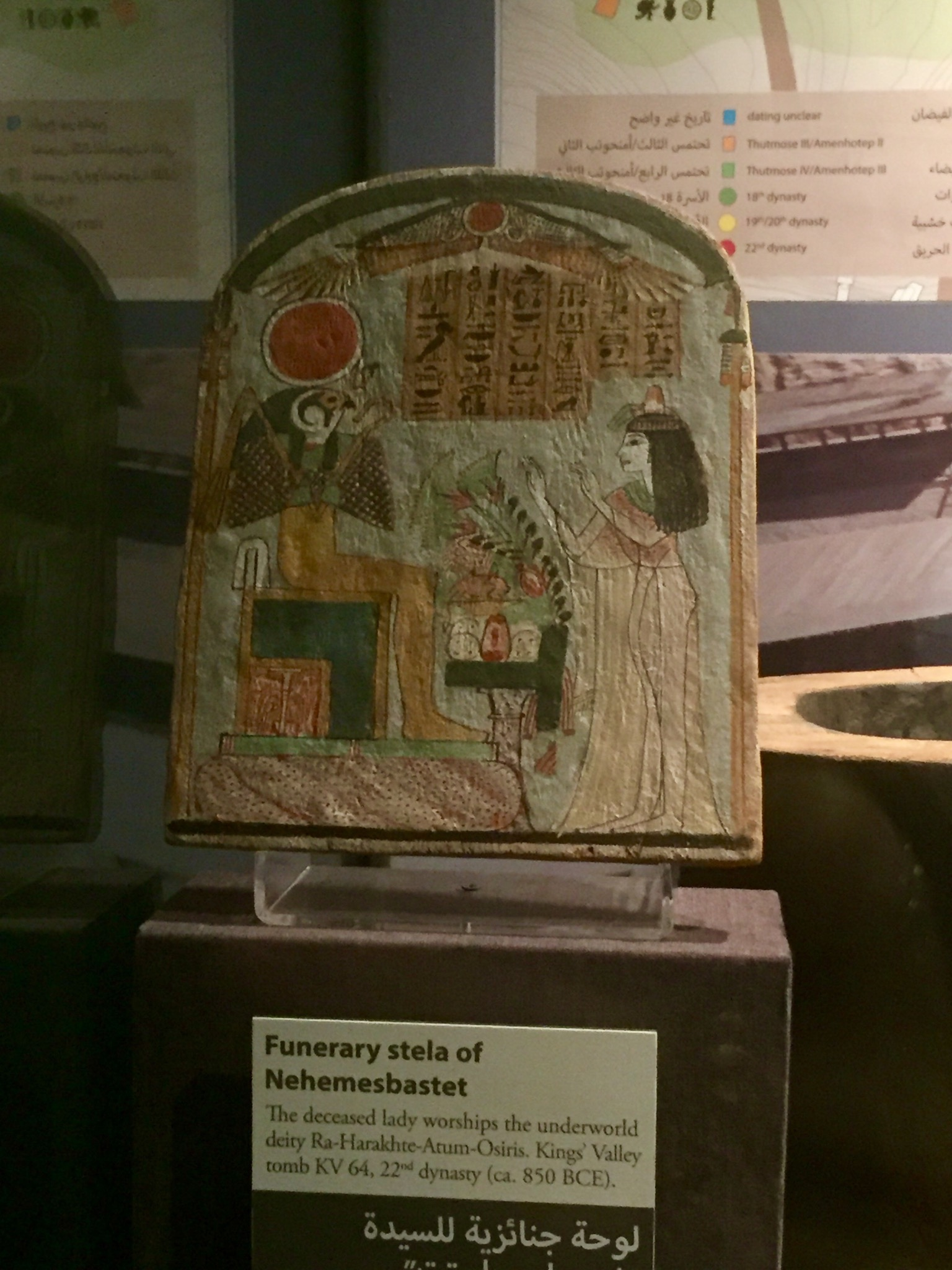
Stela depicting Nehemes-Bastet before composite funerary god from KV64 (Luxor Museum)

== Discovery and layout ==
On 25 January 2011, during the University of Basel Kings' Valley Project's 2011 excavation season, work to install a protective iron cover over the shaft of KV40 uncovered the edges of a shaft cut into the rock 1.8 metres (5.9 ft) north of KV40. Given the small size of the cutting, approximately 1 by 2 metres (3.3 ft × 6.6 ft), and its proximity to the neighbouring tomb, it was initially suggested to be a possible embalming cache or an unfinished shaft. The feature was given the initial designation of 'KV40b.' Due to its discovery coinciding with the beginning of the 2011 Egyptian revolution, it was fitted with a metal cover to await clearance the following season. Excavation resumed in early January 2012 and it soon became apparent that the feature was a tomb; the find was officially announced on 15 January 2012 and given the designation KV64.

The tomb consists of a short, rather narrow shaft 3.5 metres (11 ft) deep which opens onto a single room measuring 4.1 by 2.35 metres (13.5 by 7.7 ft) long and wide; the chamber has a height of approximately 2 metres (6.6 ft). The doorway was blocked with stacked stone but was not sealed. This blocking was evidently not original, as it sat on top of an earlier plastered blocking; a bowl of Eighteenth Dynasty-date containing Nile mud used for plastering the original blocking was encountered at the base of the door.

== Contents ==
The chamber was filled with debris approximately 1 metre (3.3 ft) deep. The room contained the intact burial of the Twenty-second Dynasty chantress Nehmes Bastet, sitting on top of the fill at the far end of the chamber; her painted wooden funerary stele sat propped against the wall at the foot of the coffin. Within the debris was the remnants of the robbed Eighteenth Dynasty interment, represented by fragmentary canopic jars and two stoppers, fragments of coffins and cartonnage, glass, faience, leather, furniture parts, and the broken, unwrapped mummy who was likely the original owner. Also found was a partial wooden label bearing the name of Princess Satiah. It is not known whether the label belongs to the original woman for whom the tomb was created. Of dubious relevance to the tomb are finds of a Ramesside ostracon and fragments of furniture naming Amenhotep III as similar contents have been found elsewhere and are suggested to be the product of ancient robbery. The tomb had evidently stood open for some time prior to the burial of Nehmes-Bastet as indicated by the presence of several wasp nests and water-washed debris that partially filled the tomb.

== Occupants ==
=== Eighteenth Dynasty mummy ===
Little is known of the dismembered Eighteenth Dynasty mummy found in the tomb, although x-ray analysis revealed the body belonged to a middle aged woman. If the fragmentary furniture naming Amenhotep III and the tag naming a princess are original to this burial and not washed in during later flood action, then the original owner can be identified as a princess of the reign of Amenhotep III. The style of the two canopic jar heads also conform to this dating.

=== Nehmes Bastet ===
Upon entering the tomb in 2011, the excavators discovered a wooden coffin and a stela placed near the wall that was facing the head of the coffin. The mummy in the coffin belongs to a priestess, the "Chantress of Amun", Nehmes-Bastet. She was the daughter of Nakhtef-Mut, a priest of Amun who held the office of the "Opener of the Doors of Heaven" at Karnak, an important Ancient Egyptian temple during that dynasty. The wooden stela shows Nehmes Bastet worshipping before a composite deity with attributes of both a sun-god and the god Osiris.

== Previous use of KV64 designation ==
"KV64" (with quotation marks) had been employed as a tentative designation in reference to an anomaly detected by the use of ground-penetrating radar by the Amarna Royal Tombs Project (ARTP), led by Nicholas Reeves, during the autumn of 2000. This anomaly was detected 50 feet (15 m) north of KV63, near the tomb of Tutankhamun, KV62.

The designation was used again in 2008 for a possible tomb entrance located near the center of the main valley between the tombs of Merenptah (KV8) and Ramesses II (KV7).

== Bibliography ==
- Bickel, Susanne (ed.) (2021). Räuber – Priester – Königskinder. Die Gräber KV 40 und KV 64 im Tal der Könige. Die beschrifteten Objekte der 18. Dynastie und die Keramik [Robbers - priests - royal children. Tombs KV 40 and KV 64 in the Valley of the Kings. The inscribed objects of the 18th Dynasty and the pottery]. Swiss Egyptological Studies, vol. 2,1. Basel/Frankfurt: Librum, ISBN 978-3-906897-32-5 (Open Access).
