= Susanne Bickel =

Swiss Egyptologist

Susanne Bickel (born 1960, in Rome) is a Swiss Egyptologist. She studied Egyptology in Geneva and then worked at the French Institute of Oriental Archaeology in Cairo and the Swiss Institute of Egyptian Antiquity. She has worked as an archaeologist on multiple sites in Middle and Upper Egypt. Since 2000, she has been a lecturer at the University of Freiburg and since 2006, professor of Egyptology at the University of Basel where she is an expert on Ancient Egyptian deities and demons. Susanne Bickel's research focuses on religion and Egyptian archaeology, particularly the documentation of Egyptian temples. Bickel is director of the University of Basel Kings' Valley Project and was a member of the team that excavated the KV64 tomb, containing the burial of Nehmes Bastet, in 2011.

== Publications ==
- La cosmogonie égyptienne : avant le nouvel empire, 1994 ISBN 978-3-7278-0950-7 OCLC 30830993 (simultaneously dissertation, Geneva 1993)
- Tore und andere wiederverwendete Bauteile Amenophis' III, 1997 ISBN 978-3-8053-3370-2 OCLC 39548675
- Die Dekoration des Tempelhaustores unter Alexander IV : und der Südwand unter Augustus, 1998 OCLC 492951604
- Aspects et fonctions de la deification d'amenhotep III, 2002 OCLC 884033079
- In ägyptischer Gesellschaft : Aegyptiaca der Sammlungen Bibel+Orient an der Universität Freiburg Schweiz, 2004 ISBN 978-3-7278-1429-7 OCLC 57010589
- Akhénaton et Néfertiti : soleil et ombres des pharaons, 2008 OCLC 778580062
- Vergangenheit und Zukunft Studien zum historischen Bewusstsein in der Thutmosidenzeit, 2014 ISBN 978-3-7965-3204-7 OCLC 874531850
- La porte d'Horemheb au Xe pylône de Karnak, 2015 ISBN 978-2-940011-17-9 OCLC 944085704
- Egypt and ancient Near East – perceptions of alterity, 2016 ISBN 978-3-447-10614-6 OCLC 953412546
- Studies in Ancient Egyptian funerary literature, 2017 ISBN 978-90-429-3462-7 OCLC 999533603
