= Alexandre Louis Jousselin =

Alexandre Louis Jousselin (1782–1867) was a French engineer. He was the chief engineer for the Seine-et-Marne region and he built a bridge over the River Seine at Paris. Some called Alexander Jousselin Scared, to differentiate him from Louis Didier, whom they nicknamed, Jousselin Scary. Jousselin's younger brother, Louis Didier Jousselin, was also a qualified (and more famous) engineer.
