= Otto Schaden =

American Egyptologist

Otto John Schaden (August 26, 1937 – November 23, 2015) was an American Egyptologist. He was the field director of the Amenmesse Tomb Project of the University of Memphis (Tennessee). In addition to his work on the tomb of Amenmesse (KV10) in the main arm of the Valley of the Kings, he has also cleared and reinvestigated tombs WV23, WV24, and WV25 in the Western Valley.

== Biography ==
Schaden taught the Middle Egyptian language at the University of Minnesota in the early 1970s. On 8 February 2006, it was announced that his team had discovered KV63, an intact chamber at first thought to be a tomb. The tomb was slowly excavated from March to July 2006 and appears to have been a mummification storage area for another royal tomb—possibly an unsanctioned tomb prematurely labeled KV64.

Harper's Magazine for January 2008 contains a long essay by Gregory Jaynes about his March 2006 visit to the KV63 tomb, in which he describes Otto Schaden's dispute with his superior Lorelei Corcoran from the University of Memphis. The University of Memphis and Dr. Schaden severed their relationship and Schaden's research was to continue under the auspices of Egypt's Supreme Council of Antiquities, a very unusual move because most are conducted under a university. He died on November 23, 2015, at the age of 78.
