= Louis Didier Jousselin =

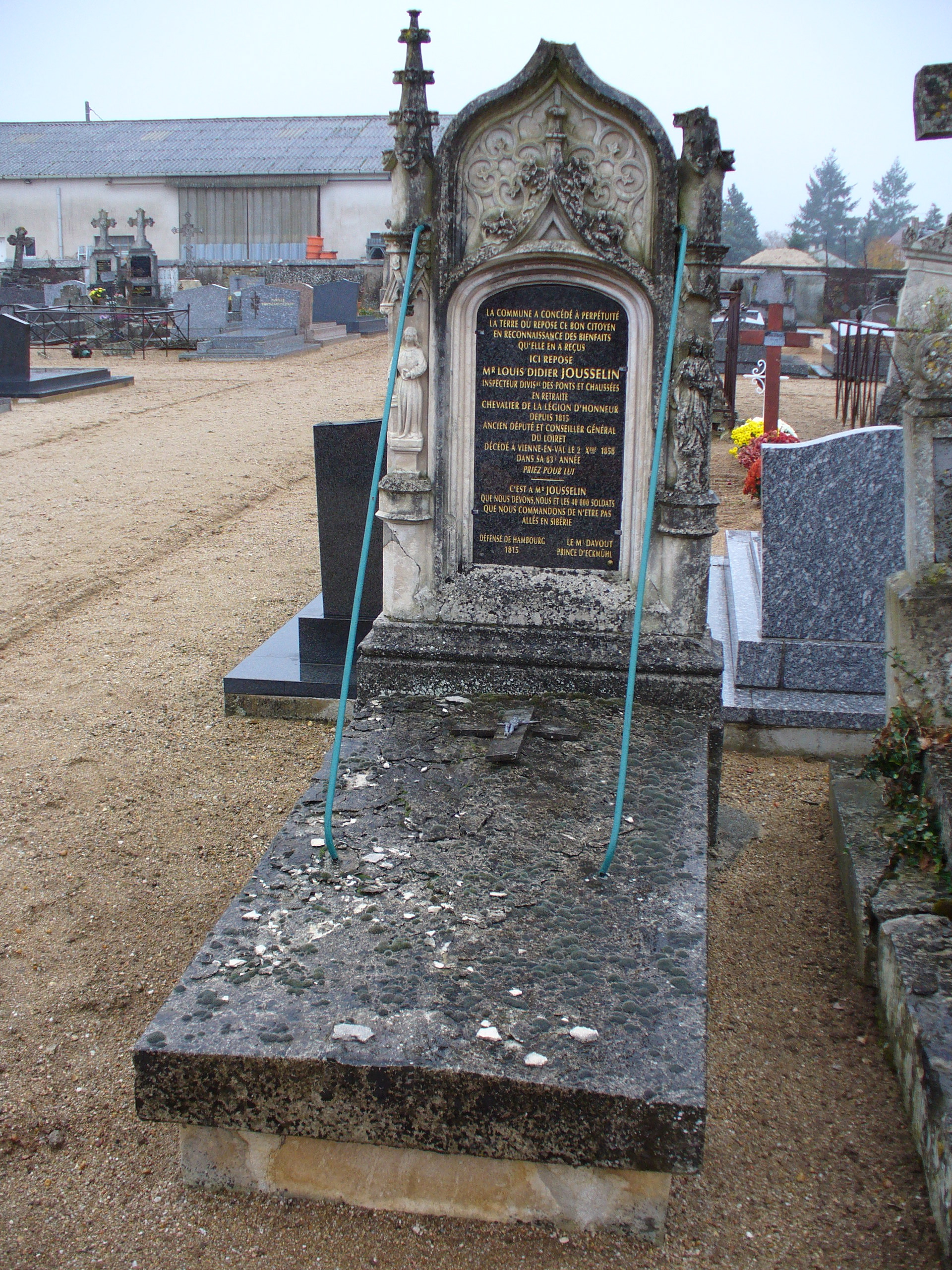
Jousselin's tomb

Louis Didier Jousselin (1 April 1776 – 3 December 1858) was a French engineer. He built a three-kilometre-long bridge in less than three months during the Siege of Hamburg in 1813. His name is one of the 72 names inscribed on the Eiffel Tower.

== Biography ==
Louis Didier Jousselin was born at Blois on 1 April 1776. His father was a lawyer who was also interested in politics. Jousselin was successfully admitted as one of the first students at the École Polytechnique, where he graduated two years later. After becoming a qualified engineer he was sent to assist with the Northern Canal near Maastricht in May 1808.

== Siege of Hamburg ==
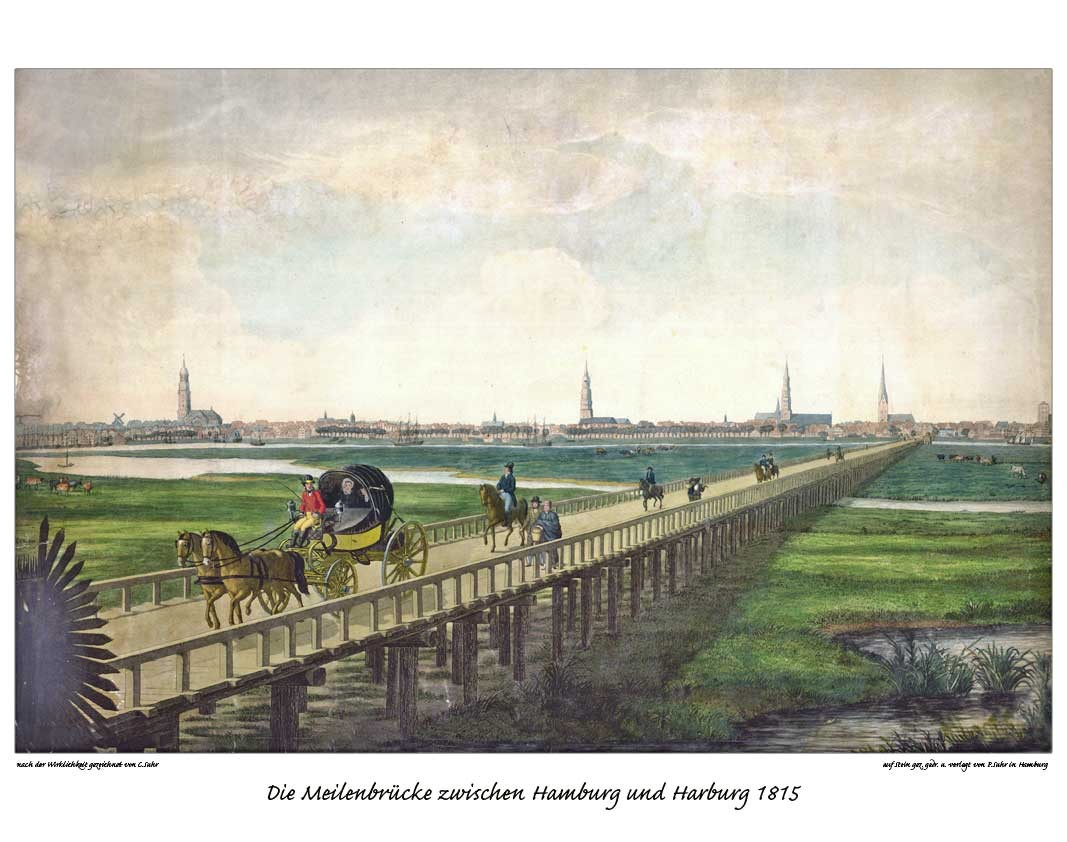
The bridge at Hamburg

By 1811 the canal had been completed and Jousselin was appointed Chief Engineer for Hamburg; a city that was then under French control. He fortified the town and was recognised for the role he played in securing the city whilst it was under siege by the Russian Army and in containing a population who were not supportive of the French invaders.

Jousselin built a bridge which was useful to those defending the siege. Marshal Davout needed to get supplies across the River Elbe. His advisors advised that boats were the only solution. Jousselin was summoned and he said he could build a bridge in three months if he was given every material he would ask for. The Marshal agreed to the commitment. The bridge was not only built, but built well within the time that Jousselin had estimated. The bridge was three kilometres long and linked Hamburg over low ground with Harburg. Marshal Devout wrote to his wife in October 1813 assuring her that Hamburg was now impregnable. The bridge was described as beautiful and prodigious. Jousselin was praised as the Marshal could not believe the amount of work that had been achieved.

The bridge was constructed in 1813. Hamburg was particularly important as it was on the supply lines of Napoleon's army. Hamburg was only surrendered when orders came from the French King following the fall of Napoleon.

== France ==
On 24 April 1814, he was sent as Chief engineer to Orléans. He was there on 20 March 1815 when he heard of Napoleon's return from Elba. Jousselin returned to Paris and contacted Marshal Davout. Davout obviously remembered the skillful engineer from their work at Hamburg and recommended him further. Davout wrote to the Emperor, telling him of his Jousselin's exploits. He told Napoleon that he would be a prisoner of war in Siberia with his 40,000 soldiers if it had not been for this engineer.

Jousselin's contribution was recognized and he was made Inspector General of Bridges. However at the end of Napoleon's "Hundred Days", all decrees are recanted and Jousselin returned to Orléans.

The bridge he had built at Hamburg was decommissioned in 1817 as it was not maintained by the Germans. However, in Orléans, Chief Engineer Jousselin built quays around the mouth of the Loire. He is credited with saving the inhabitants of Orléans from the floods of 1846, 1856 and 1867; a street was named in his honour.

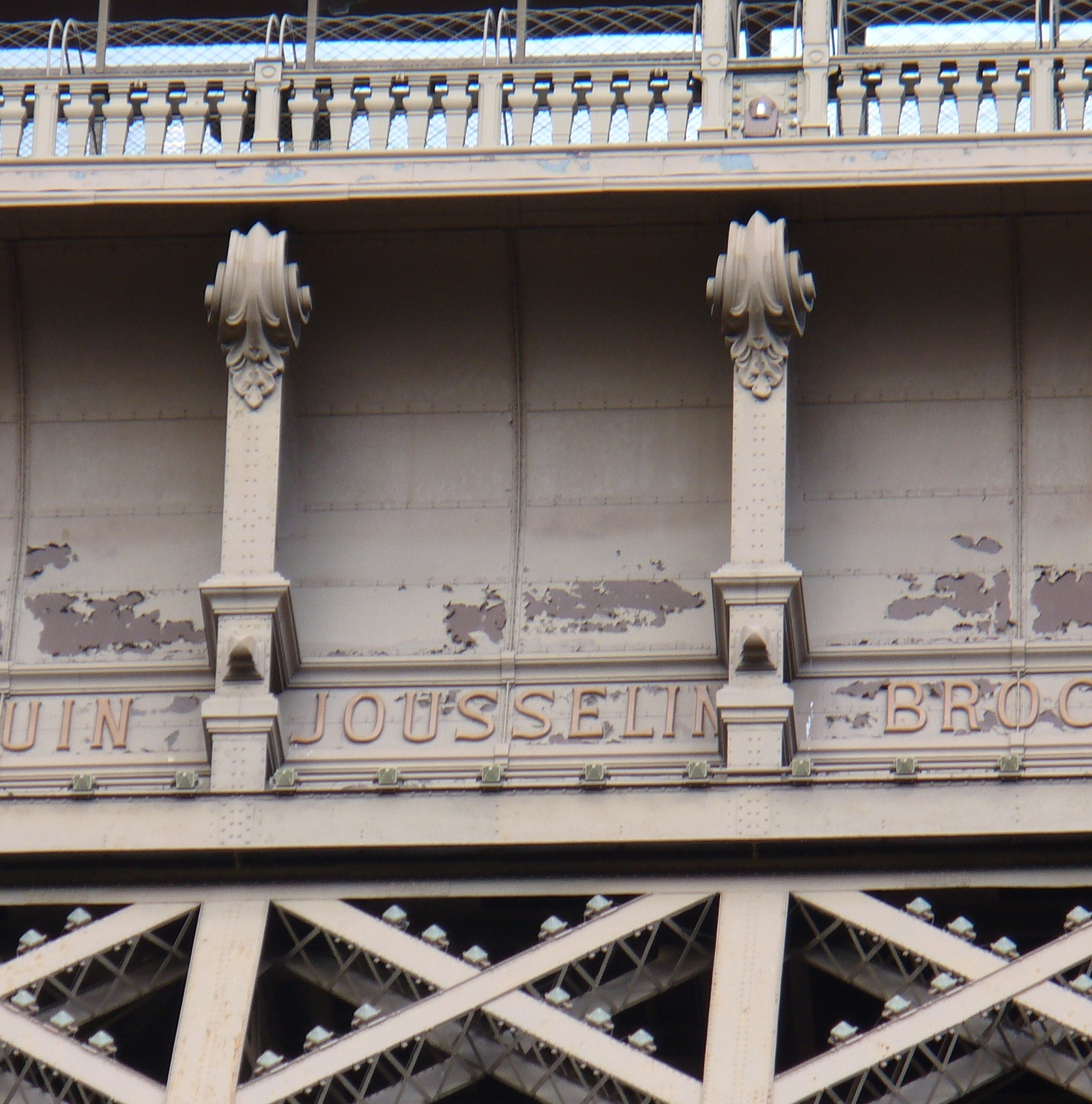
Jousselin's name is one of the 72 names on the Eiffel Tower

He was a deputy at Blois from 1831 to 1834. He continued to work as an engineer and did early work on the Canal latéral à la Loire. Jousselin died at Vienne-en-Val on 3 December 1858.

== Legacy ==
Jousselin was one of the seventy two people whom Gustav Eiffel chose as having made his achievement of building the Eiffel Tower possible. He is number 28 in this list. His name is on the side opposite the Grenelle. A primary school in Vienne-en-Val is named in his honour.

Jousselin's elder brother Alexandre Louis Jousselin, who was also a qualified bridge engineer, outlived him. He was the chief engineer for the Seine-et-Marne region and he built a bridge over the River Seine at Paris. Some called Alexandre Jousselin Scared, as he was sickly and timid, to differentiate him from Louis Didier who they nicknamed, Jousselin Scary. Effectively Jousselin was tall and had an imposing physical stature.
