= Jean-Baptiste Prosper Jollois =

French engineer

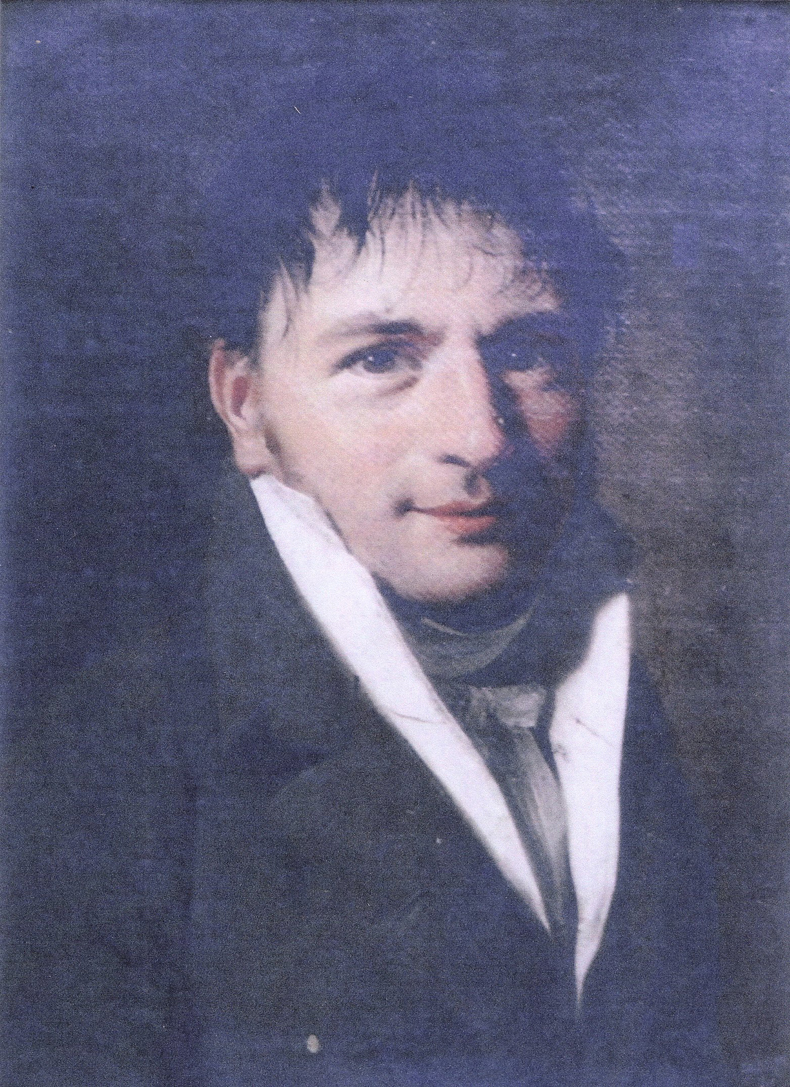

Jean-Baptiste Prosper Jollois (4 January 1776 – 24 June 1842) was a French engineer who together with Édouard de Villiers du Terrage journeyed with Napoleon to Egypt, and prepared the Description de l'Égypte.

== Biography ==
Jean-Baptiste Prosper Jollois began his studies as a boarder in 1787 at the Collège de Joigny in Yonne, then at Sens. In 1794, he entered the École polytechnique alongside Louis Didier Jousselin and Louis Poinsot, where he stayed for three years. After graduating, he became a civil engineer (ingénieur des École des ponts ParisTech). His examination to become an engineer was held before Gaspard Monge.
