= KV65 =

Ancient Egyptian tomb (unexcavated, discovered in 2008)

- Burial site of unknown
- Location within Egypt
- Coordinates: 25°44′27″N 32°36′8″E
- Location: Western Valley of the Kings
- Discovered: 2018
- Excavated by: Zahi Hawass (2018–2022)
- ← Previous; KV64

KV65 is a tomb commencement in the Western Valley of the Kings, near Luxor, Egypt. It was discovered in 2018 by a team led by the Egyptologist Zahi Hawass and announced in 2019. The tomb consists of a sloping rectangular pit of similar proportions to the entrances of royal tombs from the Eighteenth Dynasty. It contained a variety of items consisting of construction tools, pieces of rope, animal bones, leather, pottery, and food remains. It may represent a cache where the remains of a funerary feast and embalming material was buried, similar to KV54, the embalming cache of Tutankhamun.

== Previous use of KV65 designation ==
The discovery of a tomb in the Valley of the Kings designated KV65 was announced in August 2008. The tomb entrance was said to be of Eighteenth Dynasty style but nothing of its layout, decoration or owner was announced.
