= Édouard de Villiers du Terrage =

French engineer (1780–1855)

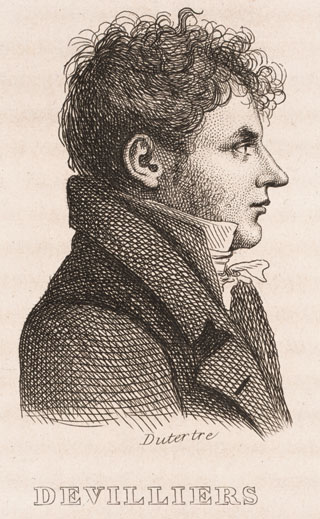

Édouard de Villiers du Terrage (French pronunciation: [edwaʁ də vilje dy tɛʁaʒ]; 26 April 1780 – 19 April 1855) was a French engineer who, together with Jean-Baptiste Prosper Jollois, participated in Napoleon's expedition to Egypt from 1798 to 1801 and helped compile the Description de l'Égypte. His personal diary of the expedition was published in 1899 by his grandson Marc de Villiers du Terrage and reissued as L'expédition d'Égypte. Journal d'un jeune savant engagé dans l'état-major de Bonaparte (1798-1801) in 2001.
