= KV63 =

Ancient Egyptian tomb

- Burial site of Unknown people
- Location within Egypt
- Coordinates: 25°44′24″N 32°36′05″E
- Location: East Valley of the Kings
- Discovered: 10 March 2005 (shaft); 8 February 2006 (announced)
- Excavated by: Otto Schaden
- Decoration: Undecorated
- Layout: Single L-shaped chamber
- ← Previous; KV62 Next → KV64

KV63 is a chamber in Egypt's Valley of the Kings pharaonic necropolis. Initially believed to be a royal tomb, it is now believed to have been a storage chamber for the mummification process. It was found in 2005 by a team of archaeologists led by Otto Schaden.

The chamber contained seven wooden coffins and many large storage jars. All coffins have now been opened, and were found to contain only mummification materials, with the jars also containing mummification supplies including salts, linens, and broken pottery.

Some clay seal impressions contain text, such as the partial word 'pa-aten,' part of the birth name of Tutankhamun's wife, Ankhesenamun. This inscription, the architectural style of the chamber, and the form of the coffins and jars all point to an Eighteenth Dynasty date, roughly contemporary with Tutankhamun, whose tomb is nearby.

KV63 was revisited by Schaden's team again in 2010, along with a TV team. Another 16 storage jars were explored, and a wooden bed with lions' heads, along with pieces of wine jars, were discovered. The team arrived at the theory that the chamber was probably used by Tutankhamun's family embalmers, about 1337–1334 BC.

== Discovery ==
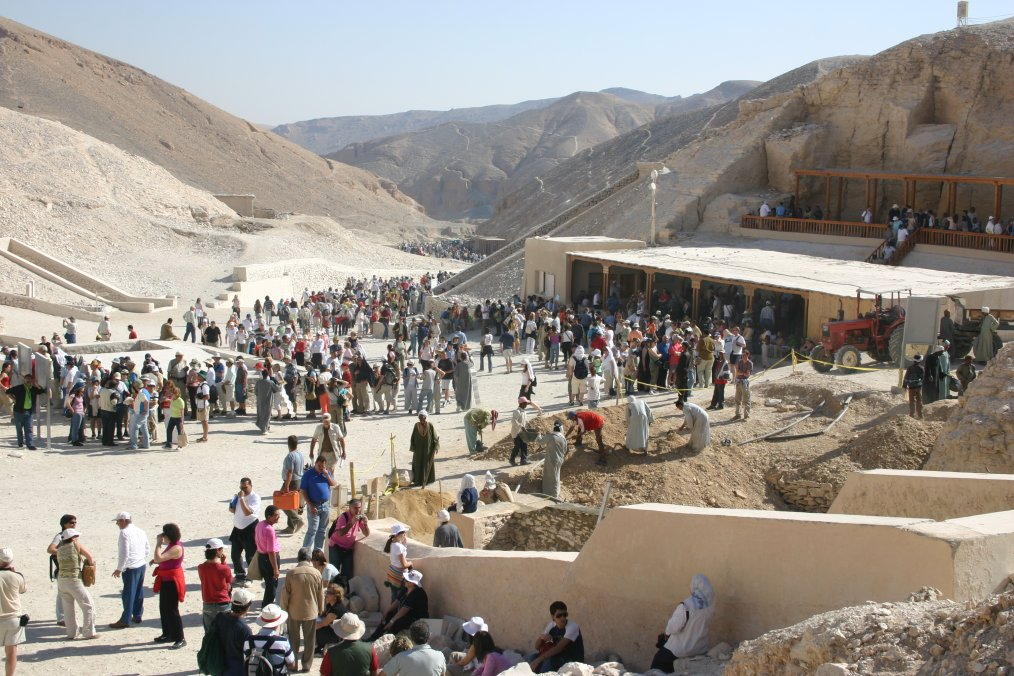
The area immediately above the chamber in March 2005, one to two months after KV63's initial discovery.

The vertical shaft of KV63 was re-discovered on 10 March 2005. The discovery that the shaft led to a chamber was announced on 8 February 2006, by the Supreme Council of Antiquities, which credited the find to a team of U.S. archaeologists from the University of Memphis, under the leadership of Dr. Otto Schaden. The chamber—given the name "KV63" in accordance with the sequential numbering convention used in the Valley—was initially thought to be a tomb, the first new one to be revealed there since the discovery of KV62, the tomb of Tutankhamun, by Howard Carter in 1922.

KV63 is located in the area between KV10 (Amenmesse) and KV62 (Tutankhamun), in the very centre of the Valley's eastern branch and near the main crossroads of the network of paths traversed by thousands of tourists daily.

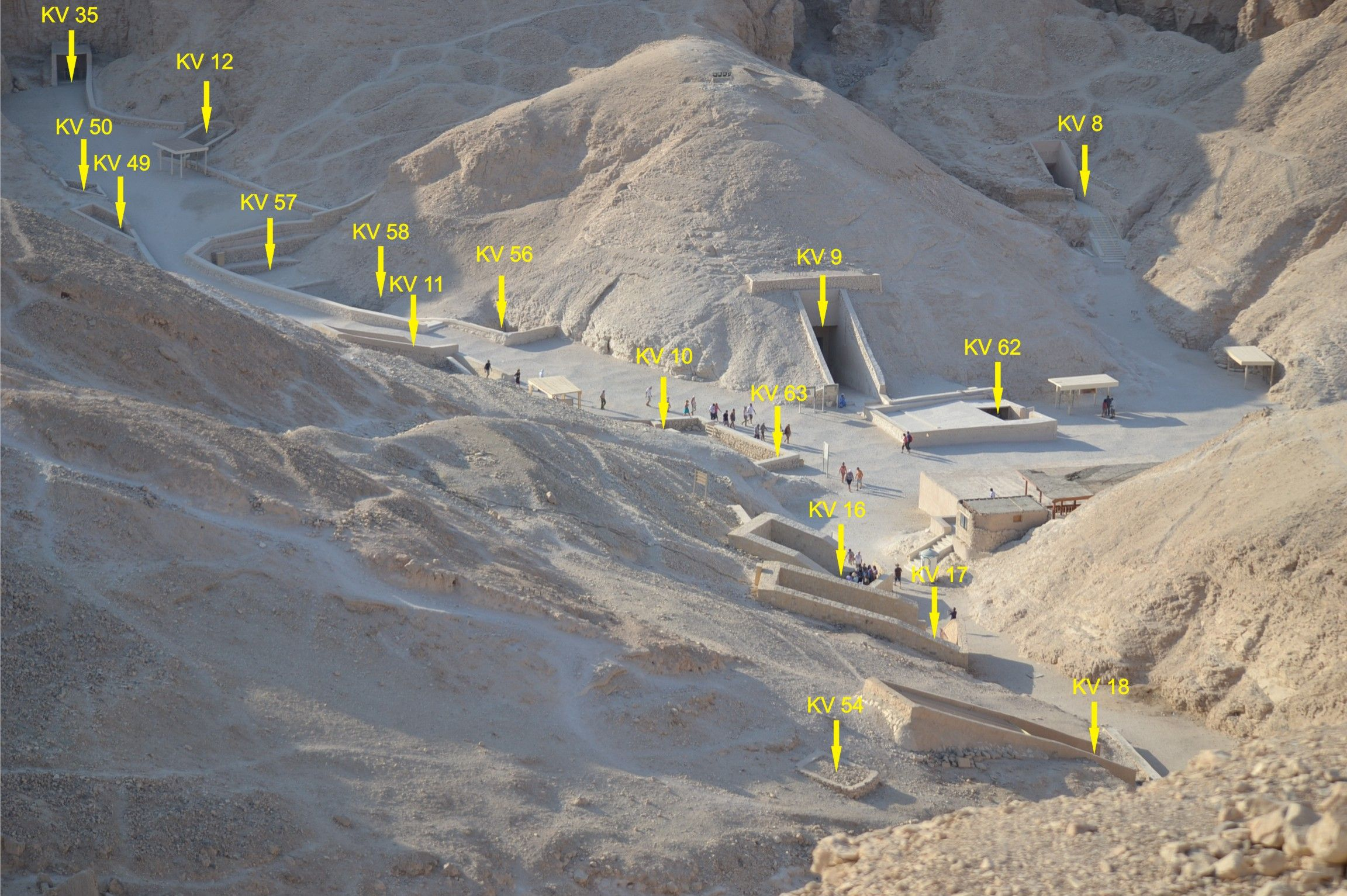
Image and mapping of Kings Valley tombs showing the location of KV63 relative to other tombs.

The discovery was made as the archaeological team was excavating the remains of 19th dynasty workmen's huts at the entrance to KV10, looking for evidence to clarify the succession of Amenmesse. The area around the huts had accumulated rubble from occasional flooding. Both Theodore M. Davis and Howard Carter had dug in the area in the early twentieth century, but had not removed these particular huts. While exploring a layer of dark rock, the dig came across chips of white stone (these being the last level excavated by Carter). Further exploration revealed a straight edge of cut stone, which turned out to be on the upper lip of a vertical shaft. Unfortunately, the discovery came at the end of the 2004–05 digging season, and further excavations were postponed until the team recommenced its work the following autumn.

== Description of chamber ==
The overhang on the shaft of KV63 has been compared with and found to be similar to other Eighteenth Dynasty tombs (KV55 and that of Yuya and Thuya), thereby dating the construction to the latter portion of the Eighteenth Dynasty (ca. 14th century BC) of the New Kingdom (16th century to 11th century BC). It is also broadly speculated that all three tombs are the work of the same architect, or at least the same school of architects.

The shaft descends some five metres. At the bottom of this pit stands a 1.5-metre-tall (4.9 ft) door made of stone blocks. Behind this door, in which the team originally opened a small window for the 10 February 2006 event, stands the single chamber.

No seals were found on the door, and it was initially believed that KV63 was a reburial and had experienced some intrusion in antiquity. The blocking stones in the doorway were not original, suggesting that the doorway had been opened and closed a few times. The original blocking stones were found inside the tomb, giving evidence that someone had re-entered and sealed the tomb in antiquity.

The chamber measures some four metres by five and has plain white walls. It contained seven wooden coffins, including one scaled for a child and one for an infant. Two of the adult coffins and the child's coffin feature yellow funerary masks; the others have black funerary masks. It has been suggested that those with yellow faces may have been designed for female occupants. There is extensive termite damage on some coffins and the result was likened by the excavating team to "black paste"; however, at least two coffins were virtually untouched by termites. These termites seem to have come from the workers' huts above the shaft, and therefore probably date from the pharaonic era. There was no evidence of water damage. However, now that the chamber has been opened, the site is at risk of damage from flash floods.

The identity of the owners of the coffins is unknown; in any case none contained human remains, all having been used to hold material relating to the embalming process. There is no evidence for the chamber having been sealed more than once and it thus seems that the deposit represents embalming debris from one particular person's mummification.

The chamber also held 28 large storage jars, approximately 75 cm tall, made from both pottery and alabaster. The jars weighed around 40 or 43 kg (90–95 pounds), varying slightly in size and weight. Three of them appear to have been broken in antiquity at the rim or lower neck. Most of the jars were discovered with intact lids, but did not bear pharaonic seal impressions. Shortly after their manufacture, the jars were whitewashed while standing in sand, and the bottoms show the original clay. A large ostracon, not identified to have come from one of the storage jars at the time, was discovered and broken during the modern opening of the tomb.

According to Dr. Schaden, the method of sealing the storage jars had been deliberate. A mud plug was first inserted, then a seal, and then a large plaster seal. Apparently, it was of importance that it should be done in this precise manner. This supports the idea that there was a reason behind the placing of the artifacts and that the chamber was not merely a dumping ground.

There was over 175 kg of natron in the chamber, some inside the coffins and some inside little sacks. The jars and contents are similar to those from KV54, the Tutankhamun embalming cache.

Work has been ongoing to remove the coffins and the storage jars to KV10, which has adequate space for a conservation team to conduct a thorough examination and analysis of the coffins and jars in a proper, scientific manner. A pulley system was devised to facilitate the safe removal of the coffins and jars from the shaft. Grass buckets and bubblewrap were used to lift the jars out from the place where they were packed away for 3000 years. The removal of jars began on 2 March 2006 and most jars have been relocated safely along with one large sealed alabaster jar, which contained small pots packed in mud. Twelve of the storage jars have thus far been examined. Contents include natron, wood, seeds, shells, carbon, assorted pottery, small animal bones, papyrus fragments, mud trays, mud seals, and pieces of twine or rope. Egyptologist Salima Ikram is supervising the removal and examination of the contents.

On first examination there appeared to be stuffing extruding between the lid and the bottom of the youth coffin labeled 'G'. When the coffin was opened this stuffing was revealed to be five pillows. As textile remnants from ancient Egypt are relatively rare, and pillows extremely so, the materials used for these will be of great interest. On May 26, 2006, a 42 cm. pink gold leaf anthropoid coffinette was discovered inside the youth coffin, under the pillows.

The last and only completely sealed coffin was opened on June 28, 2006. The coffin contained no mummy, only artifacts used for mummification or to decorate a body. It looked like it had once been used, as there was an impression of a human body in the bottom of the coffin. It is theorized that this body was moved or destroyed in antiquity.

Due to its proximity to the tomb of Tutankhamun and the resemblances between the portraits in the sarcophagi, as well as the style contemporary to the latter part of the 18th Dynasty, there was groundless speculation at the time of the first discovery that the coffins were once used for the bodies of Kiya and/or even Ankhesenamen. However, there is no reason to believe that the coffins were other than that of basic types used for private persons, probably derived from undertakers' stock for use to contain embalming debris.

Given the location of the tomb, and the fact that its entrance was sealed by the same flood layer that sealed that of Tutankhamun, it seems most likely that KV63 was the main embalmers' cache for Tutankhamun's burial. In this case, the long-known group of material deriving from his funeral found in KV54 probably represents an 'overflow' of material requiring disposal after KV63 had been sealed.

== See also ==
- KV64
- KV65
