= Amarna Royal Tombs Project =

Archaeological expedition in Egypt

The Amarna Royal Tombs Project (ARTP) was an archaeological expedition which began in 1998. Led by Nicholas Reeves and Geoffrey Martin, the ARTP produced a computerized three-dimensional plan of the "Gold Tomb" excavated by Theodore M. Davis in 1908. It was also the first expedition given permission to excavate new ground in the Valley of the Kings since the discovery of tomb of Tutankhamun in 1922. As of 2002, the project had been renamed as The Valley of the Kings Foundation.

Devoted to the Amarna Period, it was established to ascertain on the ground and in the ancient records the fate of the missing Amarna royal dead, which were transferred to the Valley of the Kings upon the abandonment of Amarna during the 18th Dynasty reign of the Pharaoh Tutankhamun.
