= Valley of the Kings =

Necropolis in ancient Egypt

- وادي الملوك; Wādī el-Mulūk
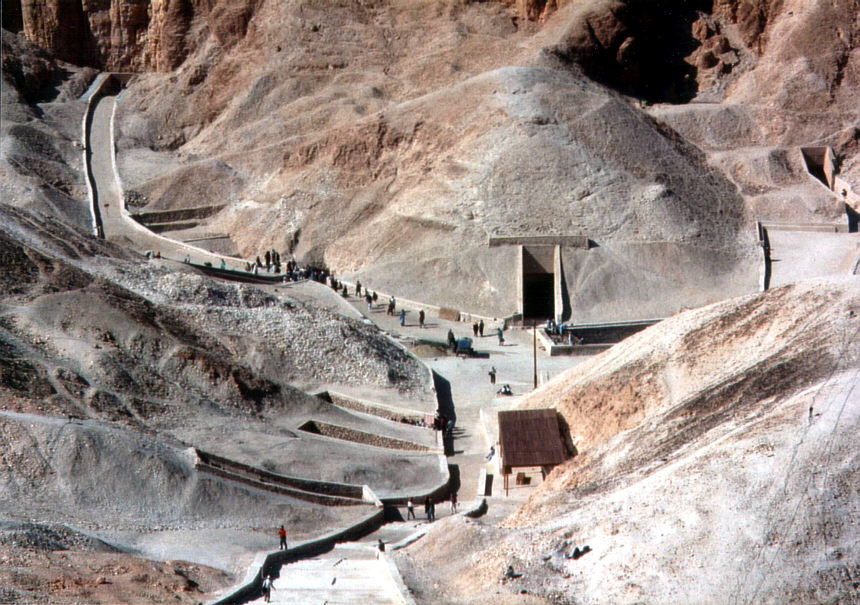
- View of the central East Valley, showing the area around KV62.
- Interactive map of Valley of the Kings
- 25°44′27″N 32°36′8″E
- Location: Qurnah District, Egypt

History
- Built: c. 16th century BC
- Built for: Egyptian New Kingdom

UNESCO World Heritage Site
- Official name: Ancient Thebes with its Necropolis
- Type: Cultural
- Criteria: i, iii, vi
- Designated: 1979 (third session)
- Reference no.: 87
- Region: Arab states

The Valley of the Kings, (Note: Arabic: وادي الملوك Wādī el-Mulūk) also known as the Valley of the Gates of the Kings, (Note: وادي أبواب الملوك Wādī Ebwāb el-Mulūk) is an area in Egypt where, for a period of nearly 500 years from the Eighteenth Dynasty to the Twentieth Dynasty, rock-cut tombs were excavated for pharaohs and powerful nobles under the New Kingdom of ancient Egypt.

It is a wadi sitting on the west bank of the Nile, opposite Thebes (modern-day Luxor) and within the heart of the Theban Necropolis. There are two main sections: the East Valley, where the majority of the royal tombs are situated; and the West Valley, otherwise known as the Valley of the Monkeys.

With the 2005 discovery of a new chamber and the 2008 discovery of two further tomb entrances, the Valley of the Kings is known to contain 65 tombs and chambers, ranging in size from the simple pit that is KV54 to the complex tomb that is KV5, which alone has over 120 chambers for the sons of Ramesses II. It was the principal burial place for the New Kingdom's major royal figures as well as a number of privileged nobles. The royal tombs are decorated with traditional scenes from Egyptian mythology and reveal clues to the period's funerary practices and afterlife beliefs. Almost all of the tombs seem to have been opened and robbed in antiquity, but they still give an idea of the opulence and power of Egypt's pharaohs.

This area has been a focus for Egyptologists and archaeological exploration since the end of the 18th century, and its tombs and burials continue to stimulate research and interest. The Valley of the Kings garnered significant attention following the discovery of the tomb of Tutankhamun in 1922, and is one of the most famous archaeological sites in the world. In 1979, it became a UNESCO World Heritage Site alongside the rest of the Theban Necropolis. Exploration, excavation, and conservation continues in the area and a new tourist centre has recently been opened.

== Geology ==
Stratigraphy of the valley

The Valley of the Kings is situated over 1,000 feet of limestone and other sedimentary rock, which form the cliffs in the valley and the nearby Deir el-Bahari, interspersed with soft layers of marl. The sedimentary rock was originally deposited between 35 and 56 million years ago during a time when the Mediterranean Sea sometimes extended as far south as Aswan. During the Pleistocene the valley was carved out of the plateau by steady rains. There is now little year-round rain in this part of Egypt, but there are occasional flash floods. These floods dump tons of debris into the open tombs.

The quality of the rock in the Valley is inconsistent, ranging from finely grained to coarse stone, the latter with the potential to be structurally unsound. The occasional layer of shale also caused construction (and in modern times, conservation) difficulties, as this rock expands in the presence of water, forcing apart the stone surrounding it. It is thought that some tombs were altered in shape and size depending on the types of rock the builders encountered. Builders took advantage of available geological features when constructing the tombs. Some tombs were quarried out of existing limestone clefts, others behind slopes of scree, and some were at the edge of rock spurs created by ancient flood channels.

The problems of tomb construction can be seen with the tombs of Ramesses III and his father Setnakhte. Setnakhte started to excavate KV11 but unintentionally broke into the tomb of Amenmesse, so construction was abandoned and he instead usurped the tomb of Twosret, KV14. When looking for a tomb, Ramesses III extended the partly excavated tomb started by his father. The tomb of Ramesses II returned to an early style, with a bent axis, probably due to the quality of the rock being excavated (following the Esna shale).

Between 1998 and 2002, the Amarna Royal Tombs Project investigated the valley floor using ground-penetrating radar and found that, below the modern surface, the Valley's cliffs descend beneath the scree in a series of abrupt, natural "shelves", arranged one below the other, descending several metres to the bedrock in the valley floor.

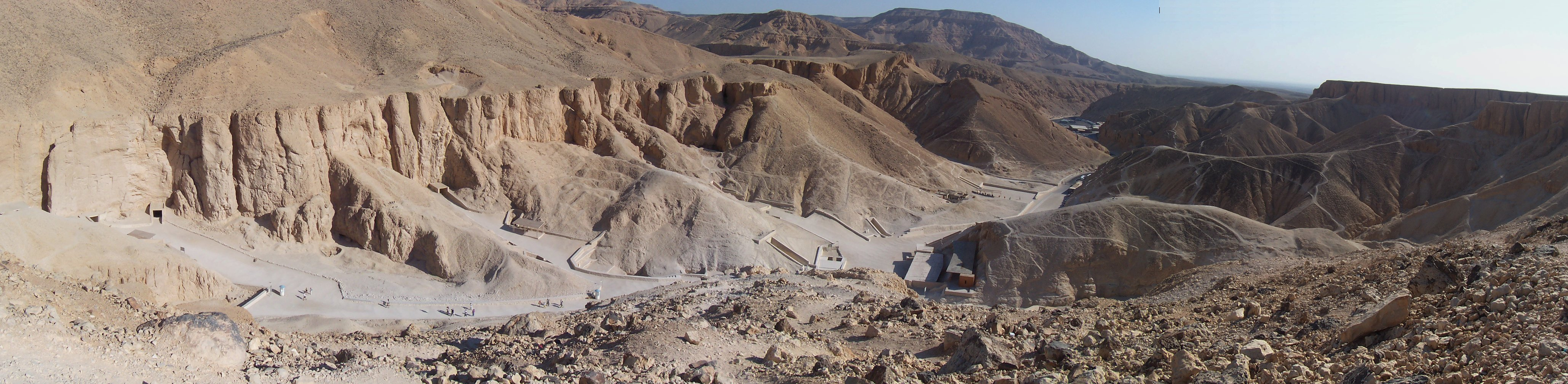
Panorama of the valley, looking north

=== Hydrology ===
The area of the Theban hills is subject to infrequent, violent thunderstorms causing flash floods in the valley. Recent studies have shown that there are at least seven active flood stream beds leading down into the central area of the valley. This central area appears to have been flooded at the end of the Eighteenth Dynasty, with several tombs buried under metres of debris. The tombs KV55, KV62, and KV63 are dug into the actual wadi bedrock rather than the debris, showing that the level of the valley was five meters below its present level. After this event, later dynasties levelled the floor of the valley, making the floods deposit their load further down the valley, and the buried tombs were forgotten and only discovered in the early 20th century. This was the area that was the subject of the Amarna Royal Tombs Project ground-scanning radar investigation, which showed several anomalies, one of which was proved to be KV63.

== History ==
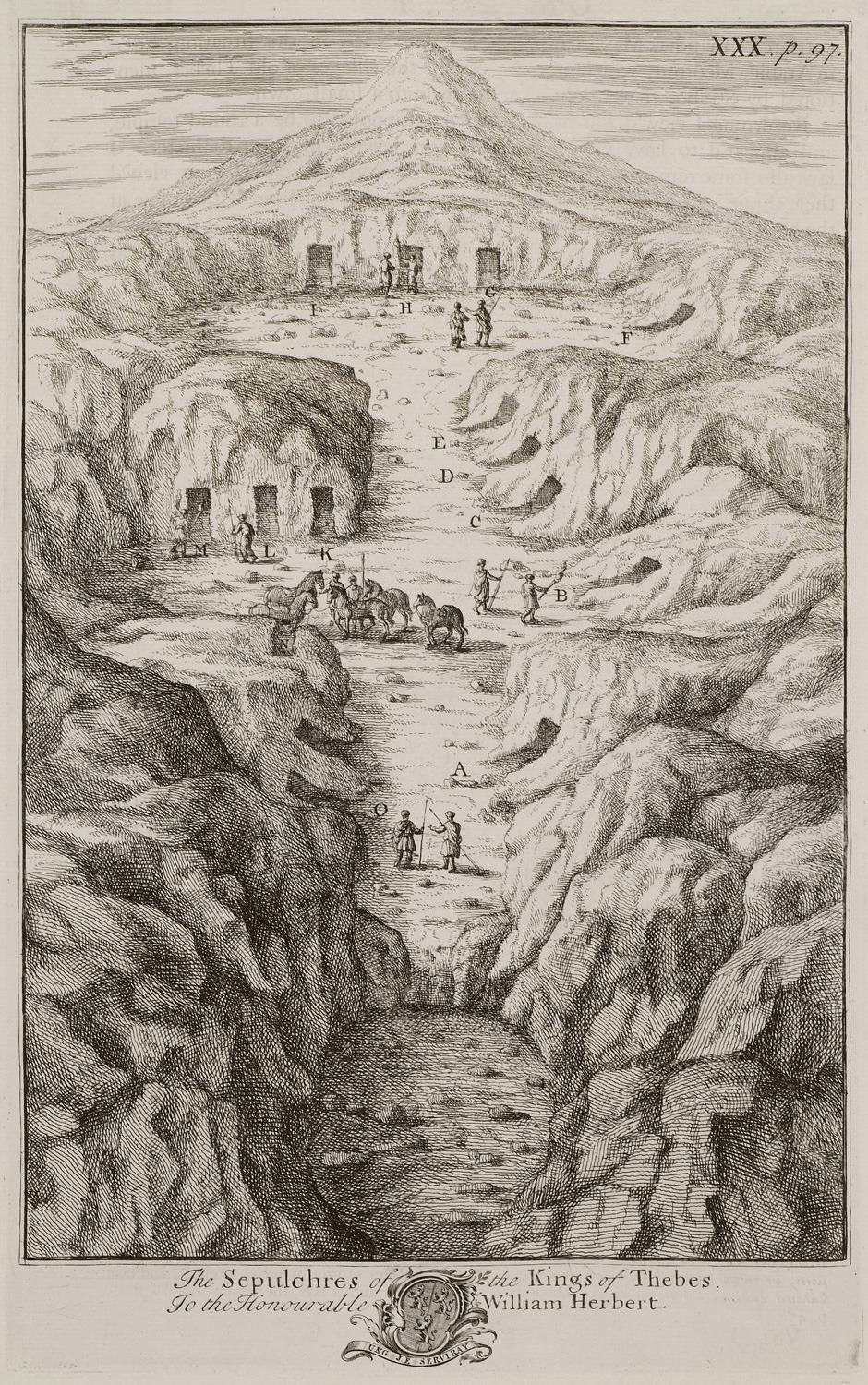
The "Sepulchres of the Kings of Thebes", Richard Pococke, 1743

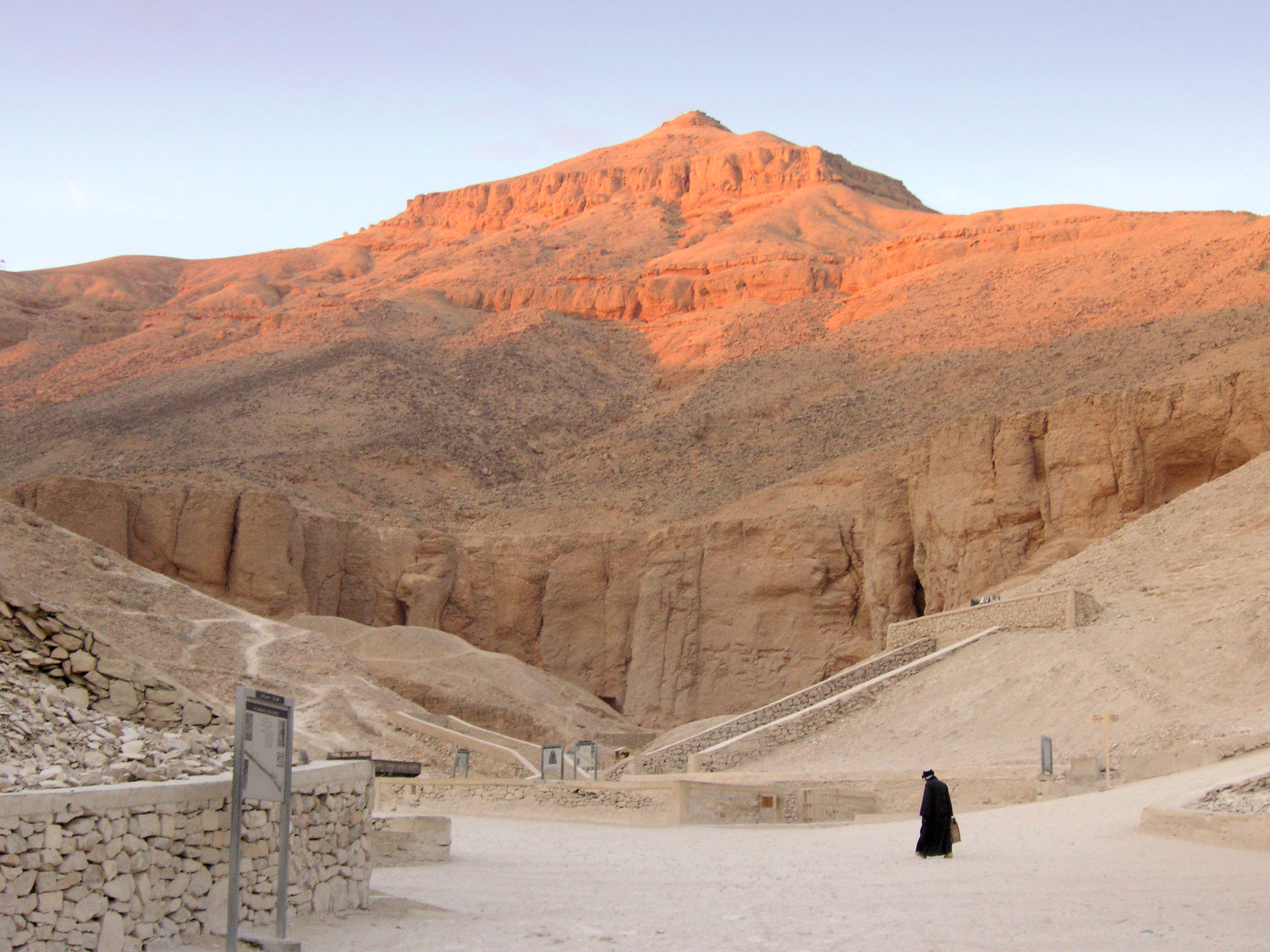
Al-Qurn dominates the valley.

The Theban Hills are dominated by the peak of al-Qurn, known to the Ancient Egyptians as ta dehent, or "The Peak". It has a pyramid-shaped appearance, and it is probable that this echoed the pyramids of the Old Kingdom, more than a thousand years prior to the first royal burials carved here. Its isolated position also resulted in reduced access, and special tomb police (the Medjay) were able to guard the necropolis.

While the iconic pyramid complex of the Giza Plateau has come to symbolize ancient Egypt, the majority of tombs were cut into rock. Most pyramids and mastabas contain sections which were cut into ground level, and there are full rock-cut tombs in Egypt that date back to the Old Kingdom.

After the defeat of the Hyksos and the reunification of Egypt under Ahmose I, the Theban rulers began to construct elaborate tombs that reflected their newfound power. The tombs of Ahmose I and his son Amenhotep I (their exact location remains unknown) were probably in the Seventeenth Dynasty necropolis of Dra' Abu el-Naga'. The first royal tombs in the Valley of the Kings were those of Amenhotep I (although this identification is also disputed), and Thutmose I, whose advisor, Ineni, notes in his tomb that he advised the king to place his tomb in the desolate valley (the identity of this actual tomb is unclear, but it is probably KV20 or KV38).

I saw to the excavation of the rock-tomb of his majesty, alone, no one seeing, no one hearing.

The Valley was used for primary burials from approximately 1539 BC to 1075 BC. It contains at least 63 tombs, beginning with Thutmose I (or possibly earlier, during the reign of Amenhotep I) and ending with Ramesses X or XI, although non-royal burials continued in usurped tombs.

Despite its name, the Valley of the Kings also contains the tombs of favorite nobles as well as the wives and children of both nobles and pharaohs. Therefore, only about twenty of the tombs actually contain the remains of kings. The remains of nobles and of the royal family, together with unmarked pits and embalming caches, make up the rest. Around the time of Ramesses I (ca. 1301 BC) construction commenced in the separate Valley of the Queens.

=== Royal Necropolis ===
The official name for the site in ancient times was The Great and Majestic Necropolis of the Millions of Years of the Pharaoh, Life, Strength, Health in The West of Thebes (see below for the hieroglyphic spelling), or Ta-sekhet-ma'at (the Great Field).

G41 G1 Aa1 D21 O1 O29 Y1 A50 s Z4 Y1 G7 N35 C11 Z2 N35 M4 M4 M4 t Z2 N35 O29 O1 O1 G7 S34 U28 s D2 Z1 R14 t t N23 Z1 N35 R19 t O49 G7

At the start of the Eighteenth Dynasty, only kings were buried within the valley in large tombs. When a non-royal person was buried, it was in a small rock cut chamber, close to the tomb of their master. Amenhotep III's tomb was constructed in the Western Valley, and while his son Akhenaten moved his tomb's construction to Amarna, it is thought that the unfinished WV25 may have originally been intended for him. With the return to religious orthodoxy at the end of the Eighteenth Dynasty, Tutankhamun, Ay, and Horemheb returned to the royal necropolis.

The Nineteenth and Twentieth Dynasties saw an increase in the number of burials (both here and in the Valley of the Queens), with Ramesses II and later Ramesses III each constructing a massive tomb used for the burial of their sons (KV5 and KV3 respectively). There are some kings that are not buried within the valley or whose tomb has not been located: Thutmose II was buried in the nearby Western Wadis (although his mummy was included in the Deir el-Bahari tomb cache), Smenkhkare's burial has never been located, and Ramesses VIII seems to have been buried elsewhere.

In the Pyramid Age, the pyramid tomb of a king was associated with a mortuary temple located close to the pyramid. Since the tombs of the kings in the Valley of the Kings were hidden, the kings' mortuary temples were located away from their burial sites, closer to the cultivation facing Thebes. These mortuary temples became places visited during the various festivals held in the Theban necropolis. Most notable is the Beautiful Festival of the Valley, where the sacred barques of Amun-Re, his consort, Mut, and son, Khonsu, left the temple at Karnak in order to visit the funerary temples of deceased kings on the West Bank and their shrines in the Theban Necropolis.

The tombs were constructed and decorated by the workers of the village of Deir el-Medina, located in a small wadi between this valley and the Valley of the Queens, facing Thebes. The workers journeyed to the tombs through various routes over the Theban hills. The daily lives of these workers are quite well known due to their being recorded in tombs and official documents. Amongst the events documented is perhaps the first recorded workers' strike, detailed in the Turin Strike Papyrus.

== Exploration of the Valley ==
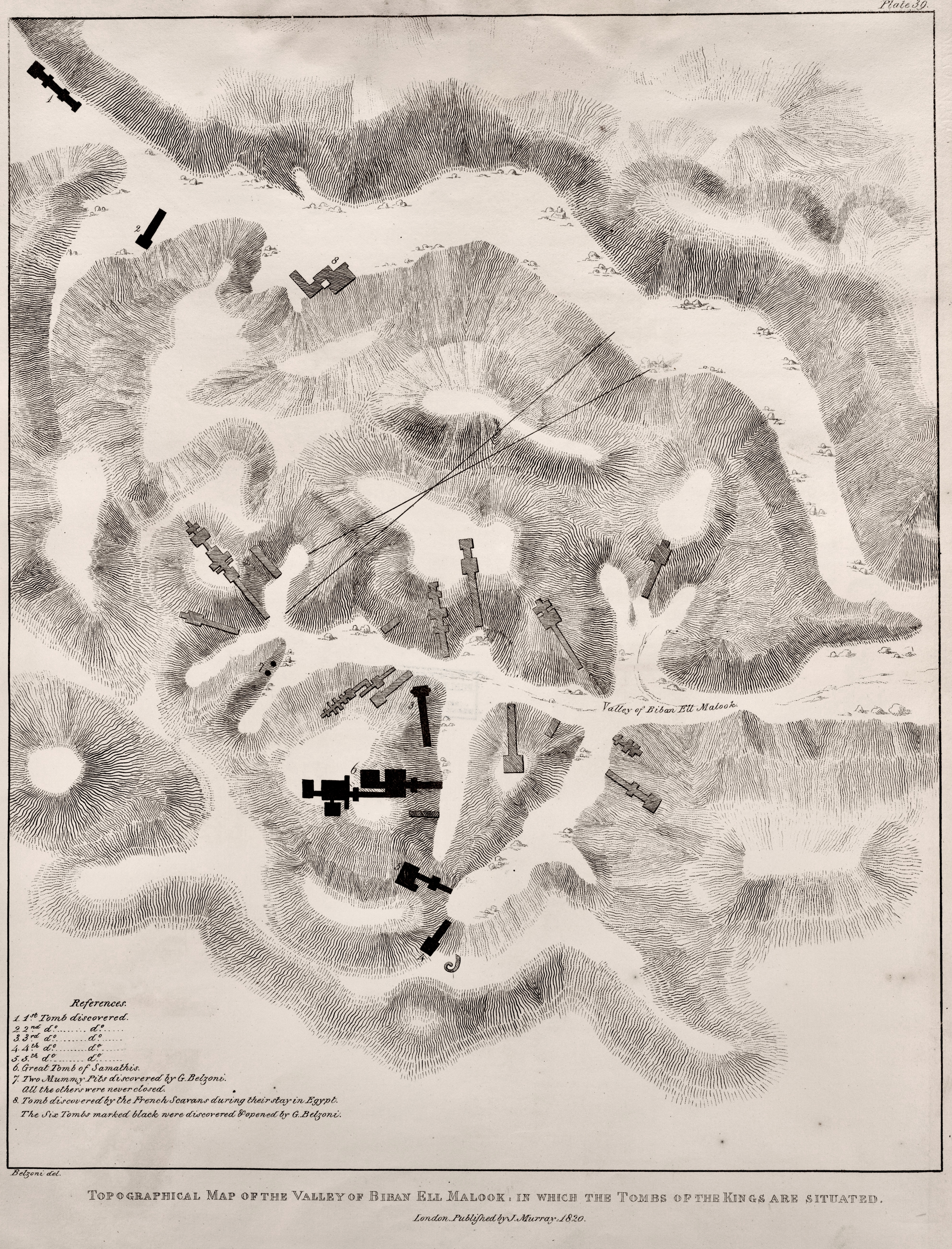
1820: Belzoni's Valley of the Kings

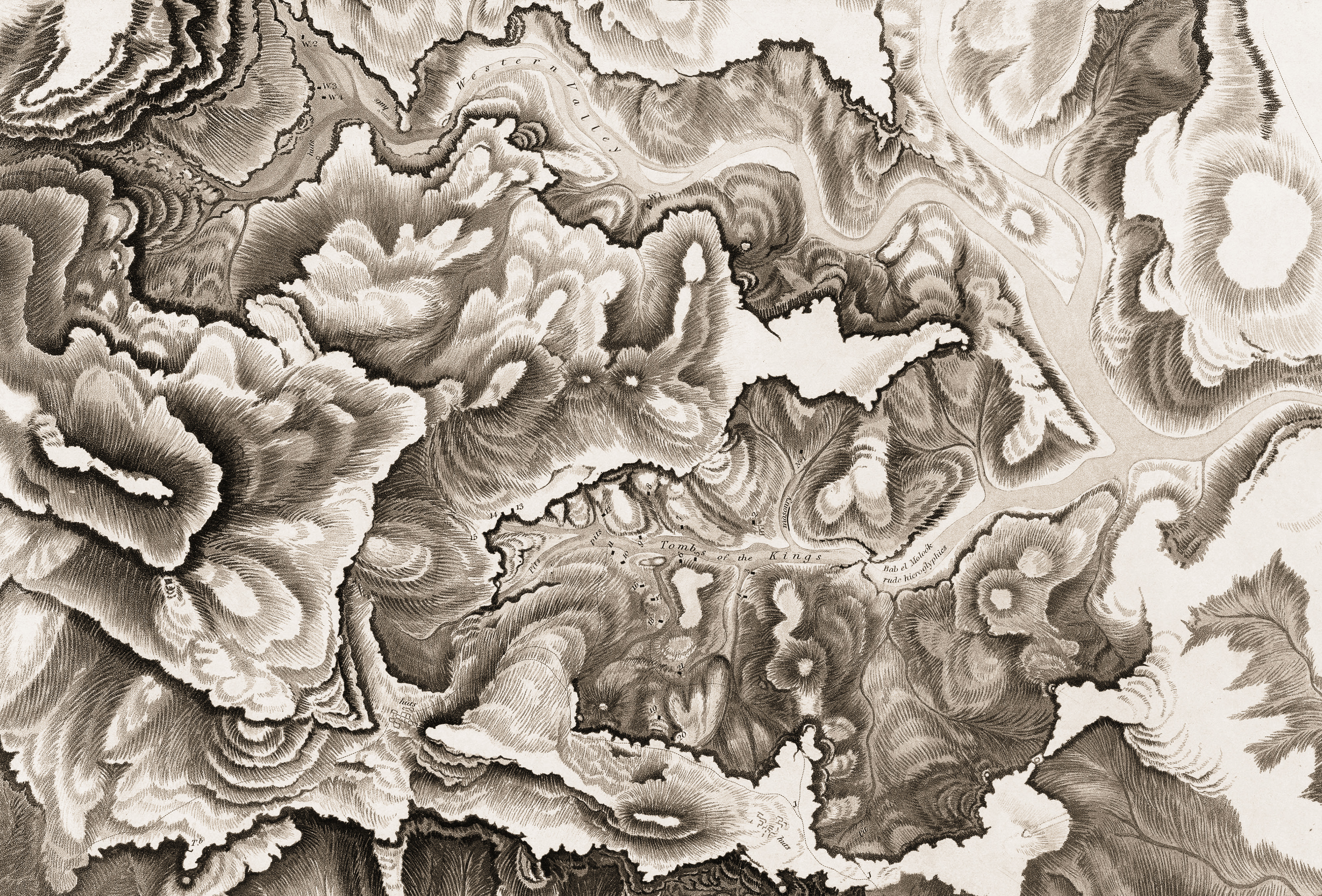
1830: John Gardner Wilkinson's numbering system for the tombs, which remains in use today

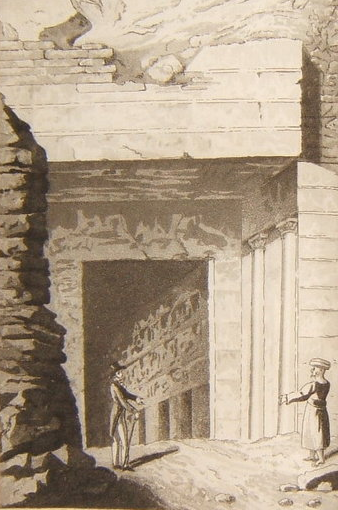
Entrance to a royal tomb, drawn in 1821

The valley has been a major focus of modern Egyptological exploration for the last two centuries. Prior to this time, it was a site for tourism in antiquity (especially during Roman times). The area illustrates the changes in the study of ancient Egypt, starting as antiquity hunting, and ending as scientific excavation of the whole Theban Necropolis. Despite the exploration and investigation noted below, only eleven of the tombs have actually been completely recorded.

Many of the tombs have graffiti written by those ancient tourists. Jules Baillet has located over 2,100 Greek and Latin instances of graffiti, along with a smaller number in Phoenician, Cypriot, Lycian, Coptic, and other languages. The majority of the ancient graffiti is found in KV9, which contains just under a thousand of them. The earliest positively dated graffiti dates to 278 BC.

In 1799, members of Napoleon's expedition to Egypt (especially Vivant Denon) drew maps and plans of the known tombs, and for the first time noted the Western Valley (where Prosper Jollois and Édouard de Villiers du Terrage located the tomb of Amenhotep III, WV22). The Description de l'Égypte contains two volumes (out of a total of 24) on the area around Thebes.

European exploration continued in the area around Thebes during the nineteenth century. Early in the century, the area was visited by Giovanni Belzoni, working for Henry Salt, who discovered several tombs, including those of Ay in the West Valley (WV23) in 1816 and Seti I (KV17) the following year. At the end of his visits, Belzoni declared that all of the tombs had been located and nothing of note remained to be found. Working at the same time was Bernardino Drovetti, the French Consul-General and a great rival of Belzoni and Salt. John Gardner Wilkinson, who lived in Egypt from 1821 to 1832, copied many of the inscriptions and artwork in the tombs that were open at the time. The decipherment of hieroglyphs, though still incomplete during Wilkinson's stay in the valley, enabled him to assemble a chronology of New Kingdom rulers based on the inscriptions in the tombs. He also established the system of tomb numbering that has been in use, with additions, ever since.

The second half of the century saw a more concerted effort to preserve, rather than simply gather, antiquities. Auguste Mariette's Egyptian Antiquities Service started to explore the valley, first with Eugène Lefébure in 1883, then Jules Baillet and Georges Bénédite in early 1888, and finally Victor Loret in 1898 to 1899. Loret added a further 16 tombs to the list, and explored several tombs that had already been discovered. During this time Georges Daressy explored KV9.

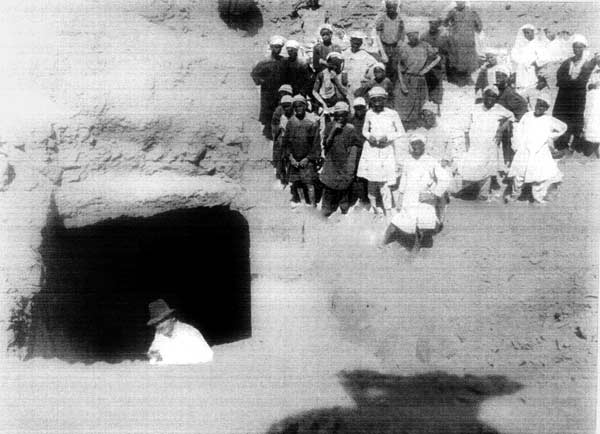
Entrance to Horemheb's tomb, soon after its discovery in 1908

When Gaston Maspero was reappointed as head of the Egyptian Antiquities Service, the nature of the exploration of the valley changed again. Maspero appointed English archaeologist Howard Carter as the Chief Inspector of Upper Egypt, and the young man discovered several new tombs and explored several others, clearing KV42 and KV20.

Around the start of the 20th century, American explorer Theodore M. Davis held the excavation permit for the valley. His team (led mostly by Edward R. Ayrton) discovered several royal and non-royal tombs (including KV43, KV46 and KV57). In 1907, they discovered the possible Amarna Period cache in KV55. After finding what they thought was all that remained of the burial of Tutankhamun (items recovered from KV54 and KV58), it was announced that the valley was completely explored and that no further burials were to be found. Davis's 1912 publication, The Tombs of Harmhabi and Touatânkhamanou closes with the comment, "I fear that the Valley of Kings is now exhausted."

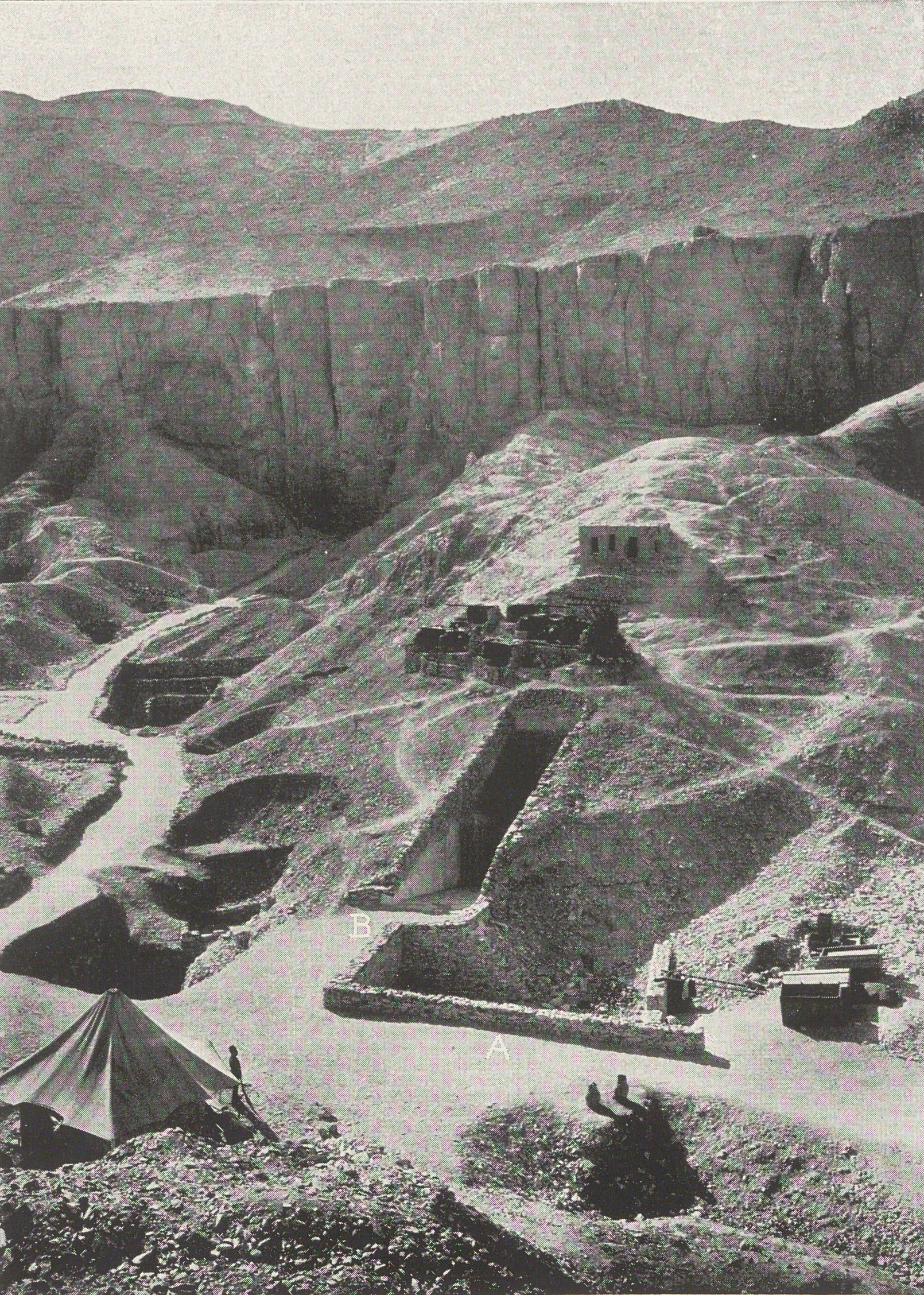
View of the central East Valley, showing the area around the entrance to the tomb of Tutankhamun at the time of discovery in 1922.

After Davis's death early in 1915, Lord Carnarvon acquired the concession to excavate the valley, and he employed Howard Carter to explore it. After a systematic search, they discovered the actual tomb of Tutankhamun (KV62) in November 1922.

Various expeditions have continued to explore the valley, adding greatly to the knowledge of the area. In 2001 the Theban Mapping Project designed new signs for the tombs, providing information and plans of the open tombs.

== Tomb development ==
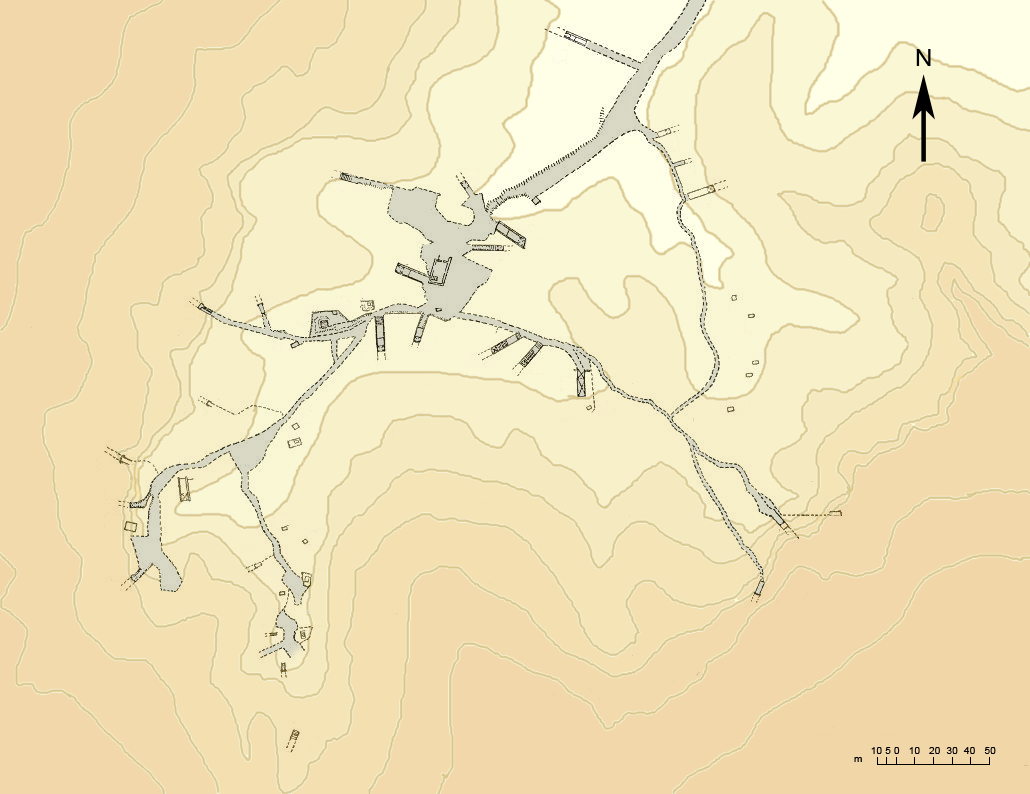

A map of the Valley of the Kings with locations of tombs marked

=== Location ===
The earliest tombs were located in cliffs at the top of scree slopes, under storm-fed waterfalls (KV34 and KV43). As these locations were filled, burials descended to the valley floor, gradually moving back up the slopes as the valley bottom filled with debris. This explains the location of the tombs KV62 and KV63 buried in the valley floor.

=== Architecture ===
The usual tomb plan consisted of a long inclined rock-cut corridor, descending through one or more halls (possibly mirroring the descending path of the sun god into the underworld) to the burial chamber. In the earlier tombs, the corridors turn 90 degrees at least once (such as KV43, the tomb of Thutmose IV), and the earliest ones had cartouche-shaped burial chambers (for example, KV43, the tomb of Thutmose IV). This layout is known as "Bent Axis", After the burial, the upper corridors were meant to be filled with rubble and the entrance to the tomb hidden. After the Amarna Period, the layout gradually straightened, with an intermediate "Jogged Axis" (the tomb of Horemheb, KV57 is typical of this layout and is one of the tombs that is sometimes open to the public), to the generally "Straight Axis" of the late Nineteenth and Twentieth Dynasty tombs (Ramesses III's and Ramesses IX's tombs, KV11 and KV6 respectively). As the tombs' axes straightened, the slopes also lessened. They almost disappeared in the late Twentieth Dynasty. Another feature that is common to most tombs is the "well", which may have originated as an actual barrier intended to stop flood waters from entering the lower parts of the tomb. It seems to have developed a "magical" purpose later as a symbolic shaft. In the later Twentieth Dynasty, the well itself was sometimes not excavated (by the builders), but the well room was still present.

=== Decoration ===
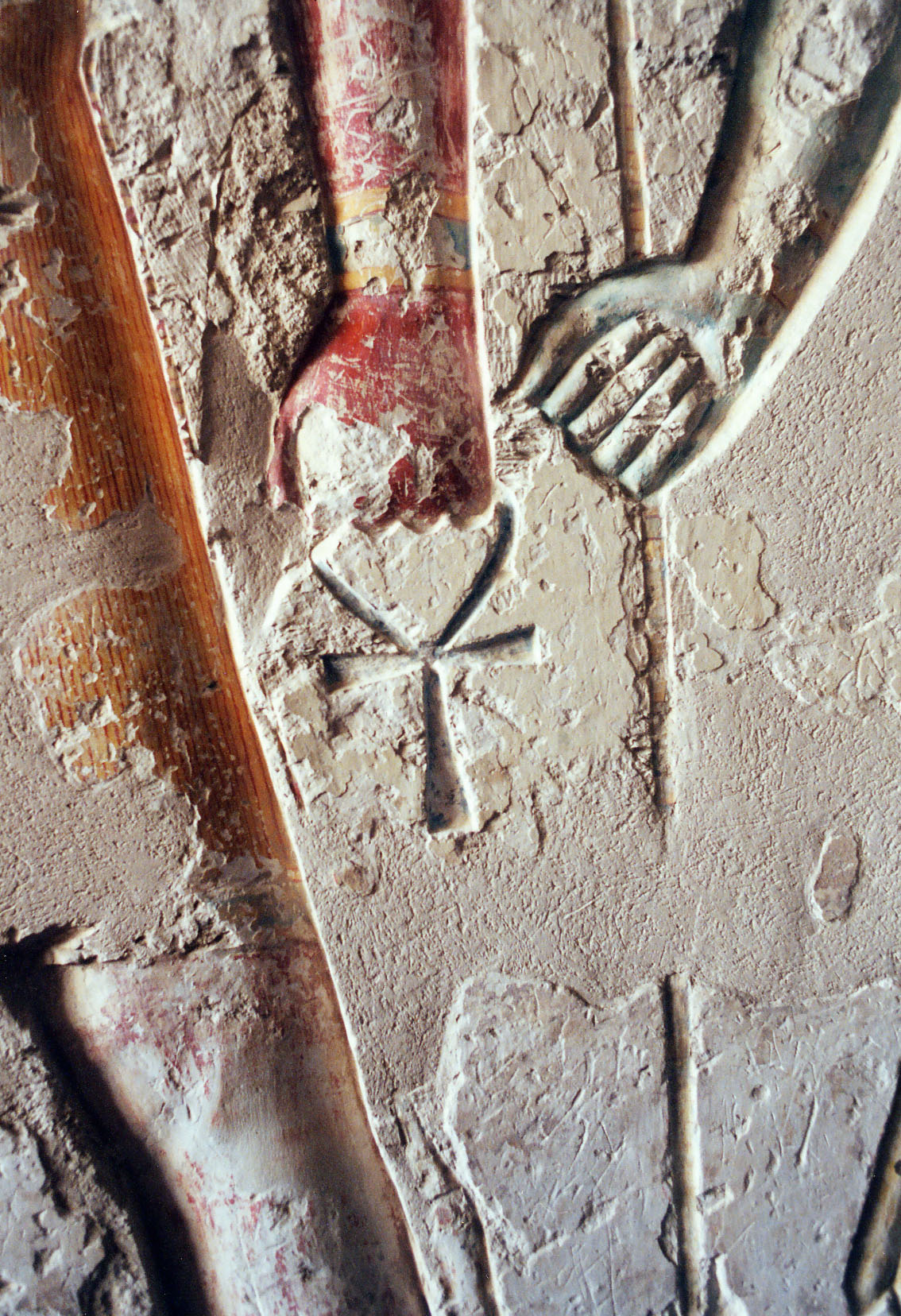
Detail of decoration from KV2

The majority of the royal tombs were decorated with religious texts and images. The early tombs were decorated with scenes from Amduat ('That Which is in the Underworld'), which describes the journey of the sun god through the twelve hours of the night. From the time of Horemheb, tombs were decorated with the Book of Gates, which shows the sun god passing through the twelve gates that divide the nighttime and ensures the tomb owner's own safe passage through the night. These earliest tombs were generally sparsely decorated, and those of a non-royal nature were totally undecorated.

Late in the Nineteenth Dynasty the Book of Caverns, which divided the underworld into massive caverns containing deities as well as the deceased waiting for the sun to pass through and restore them to life, was placed in the upper parts of tombs. A complete version appears in the tomb of Ramesses VI. The burial of Ramesses III saw the Book of the Earth, where the underworld is divided into four sections, climaxing in the sun disc being pulled from the earth by Naunet.

The ceilings of the burial chambers were decorated (from the burial of Seti I onwards) with what became formalised as the Book of the Heavens, which again describes the sun's journey through the twelve hours of night. Again from Seti I's time, the Litany of Re, a lengthy hymn to the sun god began to appear.

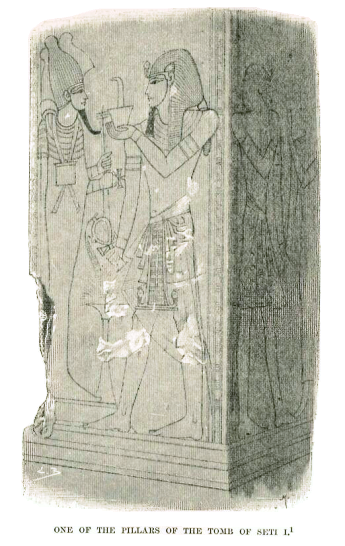
Pillar in Seti I's tomb

=== Tomb equipment ===
Each burial was provided with equipment that would enable a comfortable existence in the afterlife. Also present in the tombs were items used to perform magic rituals, such as shabtis and divine figurines. Some of the items may have been used by the king during his lifetime (Tutankhamun's sandals for example), and some were specially constructed for the burial.

=== Tomb numbering ===
The modern abbreviation "KV" stands for "Kings' Valley". In 1827, Wilkinson painted KV numbers over the entrances to the 21 tombs that lay open in the East Valley at that time, beginning at the valley entrance and moving southward, and labeled four tombs in the West Valley as WV1 through WV4. The tombs in the West Valley were later incorporated into the East Valley numbering system as WV22 through WV25, and tombs that have been opened since Wilkinson's time have been added to the list. The numbers range from KV1 (Rameses VII) to KV64 (discovered in 2011). Since the early 19th century AD, antiquarians and archaeologists have cleared and recorded tombs, with a total of 61 sepulchers being known by the start of the 20th century. KV5 was only rediscovered in the 1990s after being dismissed as unimportant by previous investigators. Some of the tombs have ambiguous burial contexts, others remain unidentifiable as regards their owners, and still others appear to be unfinished, reused, or of unknown function.

=== Eighteenth Dynasty ===
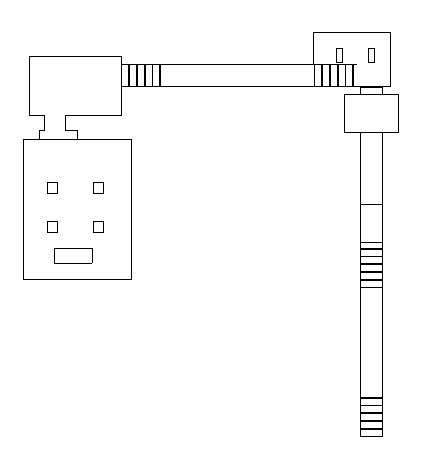
Typical "Bent axis" early Eighteenth Dynasty tomb

The Eighteenth Dynasty tombs within the valley vary quite a bit in decoration, style, and location. It seems that at first there was no fixed plan. The tomb of Hatshepsut has a unique shape, twisting and turning down over 200 metres from the entrance, so that the burial chamber is 97 metres below the surface. The tombs gradually became more regular and formalised, and those of Thutmose III and Thutmose IV, KV34 and KV43, are good examples of Eighteenth Dynasty tombs, both with their bent axis, and simple decoration.

Perhaps the most imposing tomb of this period is that of Amenhotep III, WV22, located in the West Valley. It was re-investigated in the 1990s by a team from Waseda University, Japan, but it is not open to the public.

At the same time, powerful and influential nobles began to be buried with the royal family; the most famous of these tombs is the joint tomb of Yuya and Tjuyu, KV46. They were possibly the parents of Queen Tiy. Until the discovery of the tomb of Tutankhamun, this was the best-preserved of the tombs that had been discovered in the Valley.

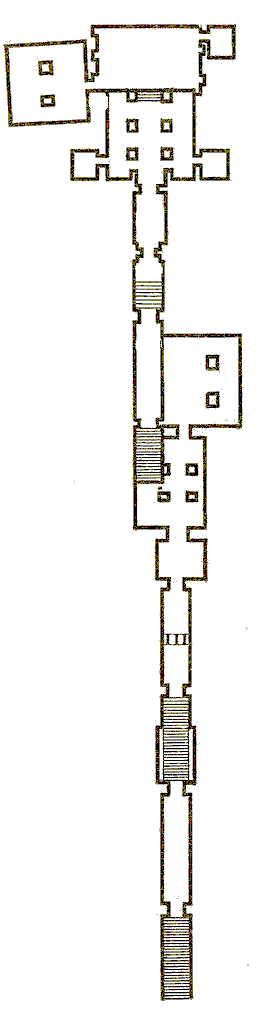
Typical "Jogged axis" post-Amarna tomb

==== Amarna Period ====
The return of royal burials to Thebes after the end of the Amarna Period marks a change to the layout of royal burials, with the intermediate 'jogged axis' gradually giving way to the 'straight axis' of later dynasties. In the Western Valley, there is a tomb commencement that is thought to have been started for Akhenaten, but it is no more than a gateway and a series of steps. The tomb of Ay, Tutankhamun's successor is close by. It is likely that this tomb was started for Tutankhamun (its decoration is of a similar style), but later usurped for Ay's burial. This would mean that KV62 may have been Ay's original tomb, which would explain the smaller size and unusual layout for a royal tomb.

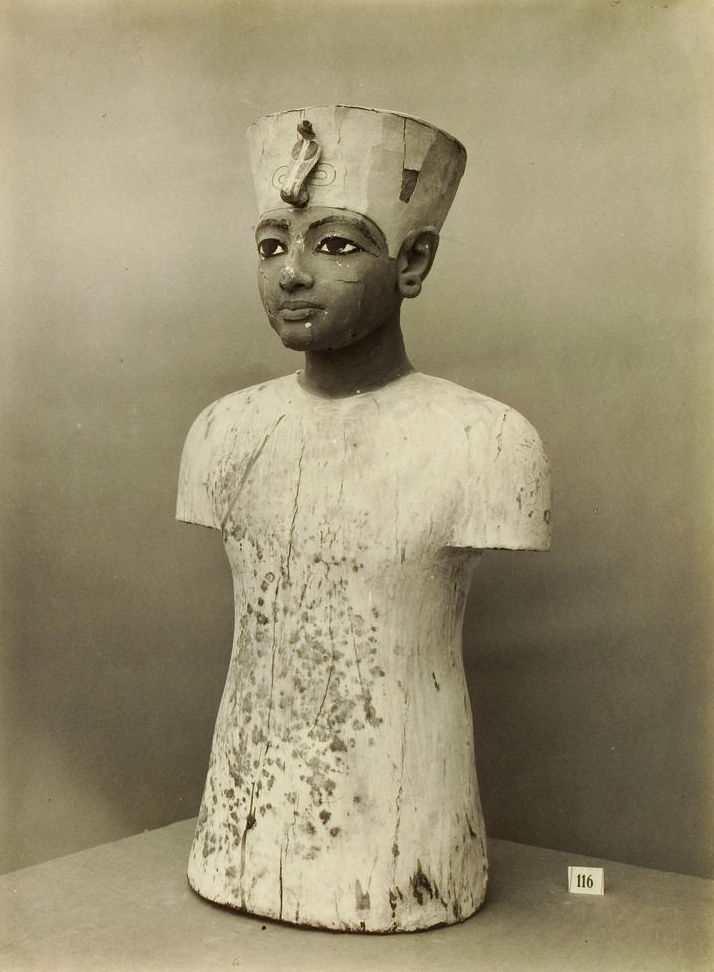
A painted, wooden figure of Tutankhamun found in his royal tomb

The other Amarna Period tombs are located in a smaller, central area in the centre of the East Valley, with a possible mummy cache (KV55) that may contain the burials of several Amarna Period royals – Tiy and Smenkhkare or Akhenaten.

In close proximity is the burial of Tutankhamun, perhaps the most famous discovery of modern Western archaeology. It was discovered by Howard Carter on 4 November 1922, with clearance and conservation work continuing until 1932. This was the first royal tomb to be discovered that was still largely intact, although tomb robbers had entered. Until the excavation of KV63 on 10 March 2005, it was considered the last major discovery in the valley. The opulence of his grave goods notwithstanding, Tutankhamun was a relatively minor king, and other burials probably had more numerous treasures.

In the same central area as KV62 and KV63, is "KV64", a radar anomaly believed to be a tomb or chamber announced on 28 July 2006. It was not an official designation, and the actual existence of a tomb at all was dismissed by the Supreme Council of Antiquities, prior to finally excavating and describing it during 2011–2012.

The nearby tomb of Horemheb, (KV57) is rarely open to visitors, but it has many unique features and is extensively decorated. The decoration shows a transition from the pre-Amarna tombs to those of the 19th dynasty tombs that followed.

=== Nineteenth Dynasty ===
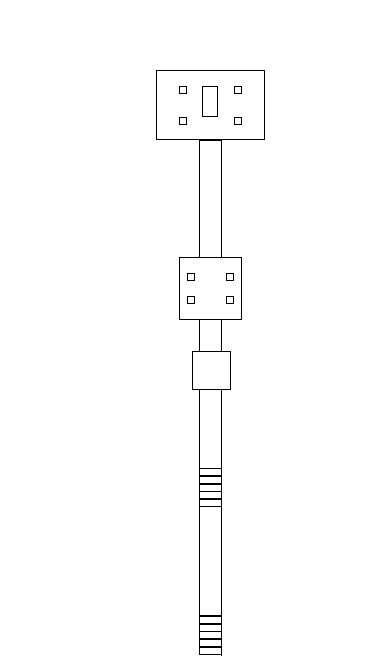
Typical "Straight axis" Nineteenth/Twentieth Dynasty tomb

The Nineteenth Dynasty saw a further standardisation of tomb layout and decoration. The tomb of the first king of the dynasty, Ramesses I, was hurriedly finished due to the early death of the king and is little more than a truncated descending corridor and a burial chamber. However, KV16 has vibrant decoration and still contains the sarcophagus of the king. Its central location makes it one of the more frequently visited tombs. It shows the development of the tomb entrance and passage and of decoration.

His son and successor, Seti I's tomb KV17 (also known as Belzoni's tomb, the tomb of Apis, or the tomb of Psammis, son of Necho), is usually regarded as the finest tomb in the valley. It has extensive relief work and paintings. When it was rediscovered by Belzoni in 1817, he referred to it as "a fortunate day."

The son of Seti, Ramesses II (Ramesses the Great), constructed a massive tomb, KV7, but it is in a ruinous state. It is currently undergoing excavation and conservation by a Franco-Egyptian team led by Christian Leblanc. The tomb is vast in size, about the same length, and a larger area, of the tomb of his father.

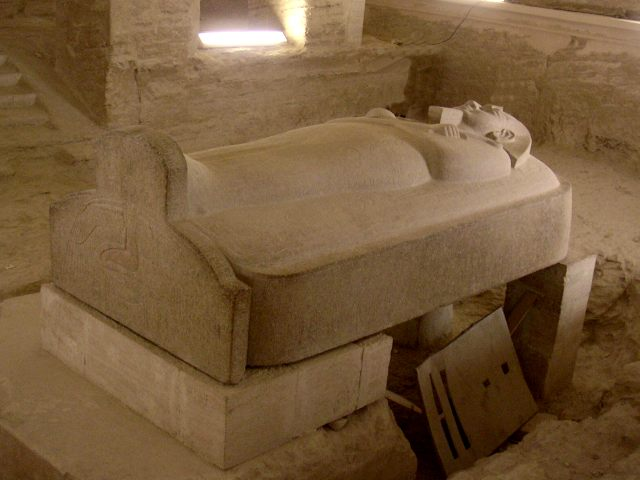
Merenptah's stone sarcophagus in KV8

At the same time, and just opposite his own tomb, Ramesses enlarged the earlier small tomb of an unknown Eighteenth Dynasty noble (KV5) for his numerous sons. With 120 known rooms, and excavation work still underway, it is probably the largest tomb in the valley. Originally opened (and robbed) in antiquity, it is a low-lying structure that has been particularly prone to the flash floods that sometimes hit the area. Tonnes of debris and material has washed in over the centuries, ultimately concealing its vast size. It is not currently open to the public.

Ramesses II's son and eventual successor, Merenptah's tomb has been open since antiquity; it extends 160 metres, ending in a burial chamber that once contained a set of four nested sarcophagi. Well decorated, it is typically open to the public most years.

The last kings of the dynasty also constructed tombs in the valley, all of which follow the same general pattern of layout and decoration. Notable amongst these is the tomb of Siptah, which is well decorated, especially the ceiling.

=== Twentieth Dynasty ===
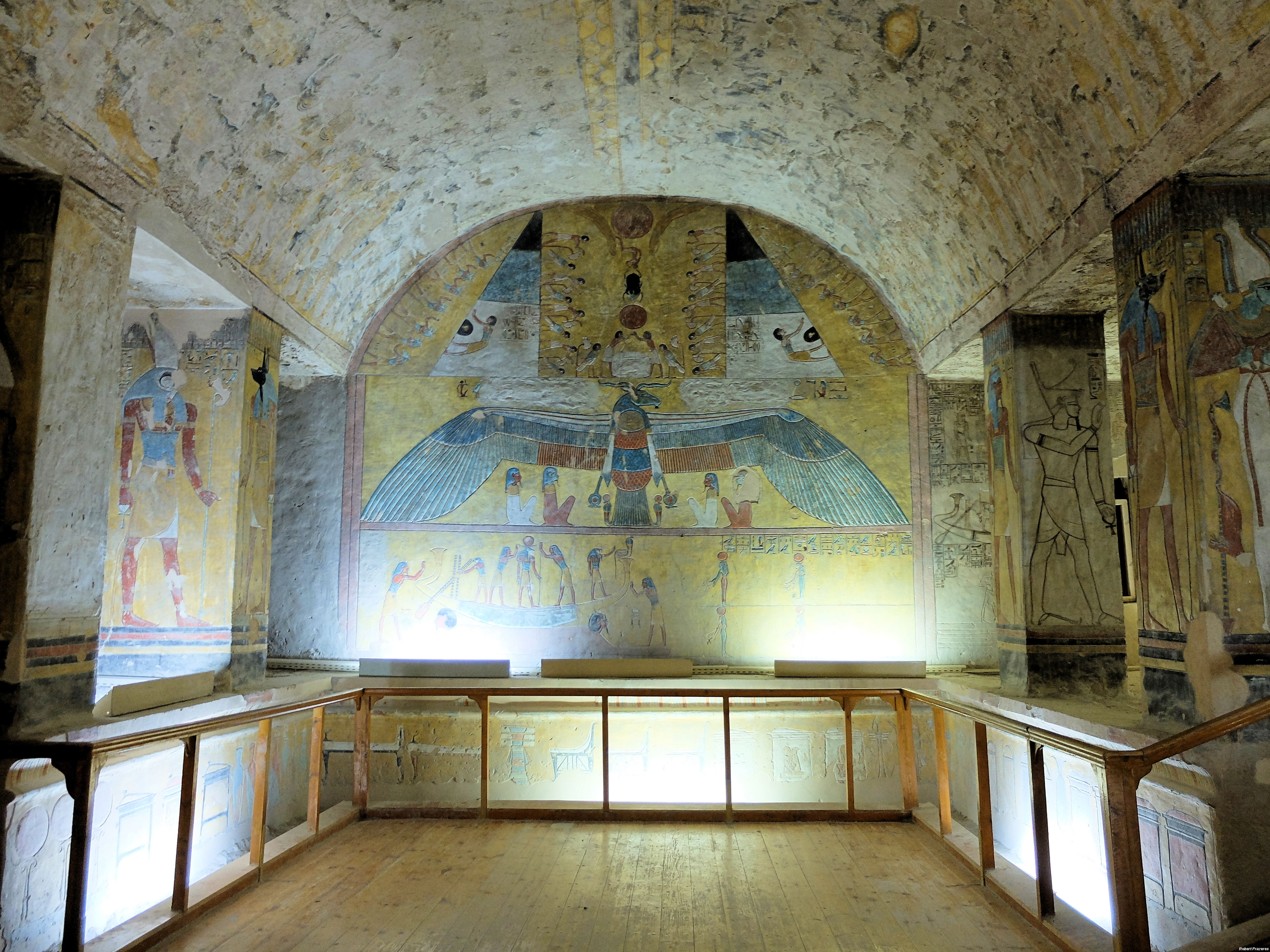
First (upper) burial hall in the tomb of Twosret and Setnakhte, KV14; scenes from the Book of Caverns are depicted on the far wall

The first ruler of the dynasty, Setnakhte, had two tombs constructed for himself. He started excavating the eventual tomb of his son, Ramesses III, but abandoned that dig when it unintentionally broke into another tomb. He then usurped and completed the tomb of the Nineteenth Dynasty female pharaoh Tausret, KV14. Therefore, this tomb has two burial chambers, the later extensions making this one of the largest of the Royal tombs, at over 150 metres. KV11 was later restarted and extended and on a different axis for Ramesses III.

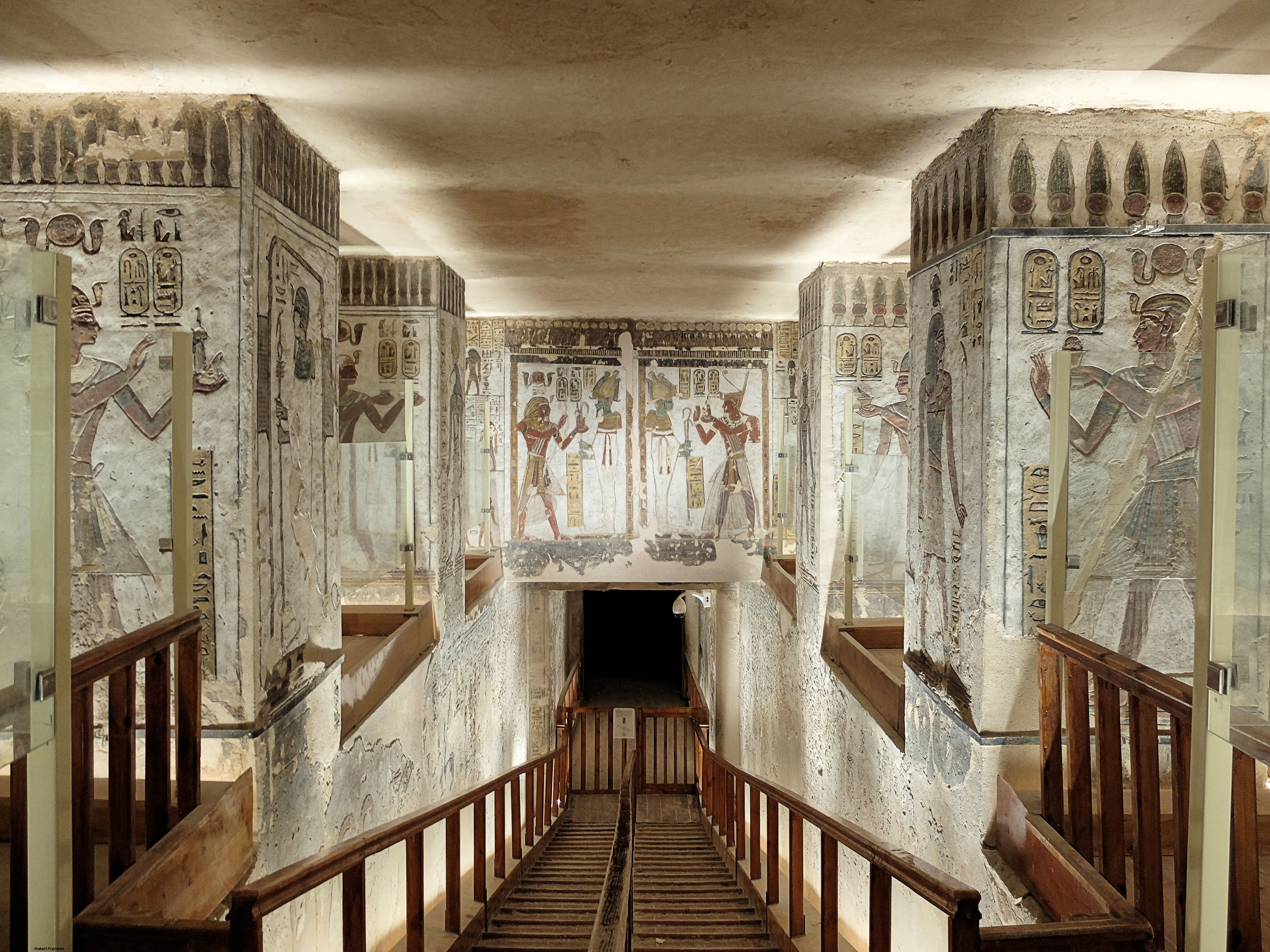
Corridor descending to the Tomb of Ramesses III, KV11

The tomb of Ramesses III (KV11, known as Bruce's Tomb or The Harper's Tomb due to its decoration) is one of the largest tombs in the valley and is open to the public. It is located close to the central 'rest–area', and its location and superb decoration make this one of the tombs most visited by tourists.

The successors and offspring of Ramesses III constructed tombs that had straight axes. They all had similar decorations. Notable amongst these is KV2, the tomb of Ramesses IV, which has been open since antiquity, containing a large amount of hieratic graffiti. The tomb is mostly intact and is decorated with scenes from several religious texts. The joint tomb of Ramesses V and Ramesses VI, KV9 (also known as the Tomb of Memnon or La Tombe de la Métempsychose) is decorated with many sunk-relief carvings, depicting illustrated scenes from religious texts. Open since antiquity, it contains over a thousand examples of graffiti written in ancient Greek, Latin and Coptic. The spoil from the excavation and later clearance of this tomb, together with later construction of workers huts, covered the earlier burial of KV62 and seems to have been what protected that tomb from earlier discovery and looting.

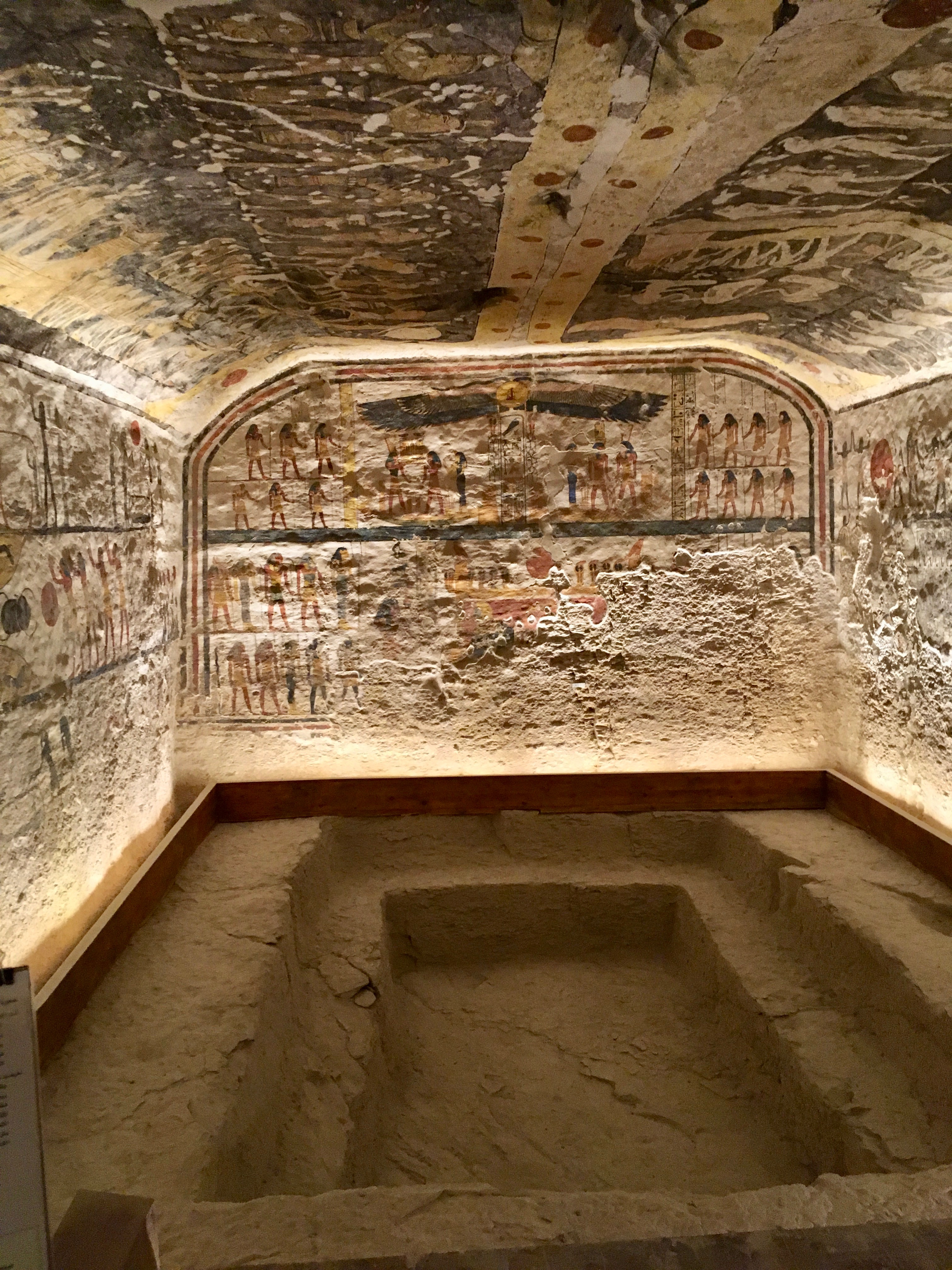
Burial chamber in the Tomb of Ramesses IX, KV6

The tomb of Ramesses IX, KV6, has been open since antiquity, as can be seen by the graffiti left on its walls by Roman and Coptic visitors. Located in the central part of the valley, it is between and slightly above KV5 and KV55. The tomb extends a total distance of 105 metres into the hillside, including extensive side chambers that were neither decorated nor finished. The hasty and incomplete nature of the rock-cutting and decorations (it is only decorated for a little over half its length) within the tomb indicate that the tomb was not completed by the time of Ramesses' death, with the completed hall of pillars serving as the burial chamber.

Another notable tomb from this dynasty is KV19, the tomb of Mentuherkhepshef (son of Ramesses IX). This small tomb is simply a converted, unfinished corridor, but the decoration is extensive. The tomb has been newly restored and opened for visitors.

=== Twenty-first Dynasty and the decline of the necropolis ===
By the end of the New Kingdom, Egypt had entered a long period of political and economic decline. The priests at Thebes grew more powerful, and they effectively administered Upper Egypt, while kings ruling from Tanis controlled Lower Egypt. Some attempt at using the open tombs was made at the start of the Twenty-first Dynasty, with the High Priest of Amun, Pinedjem I, adding his cartouche to KV4. The Valley began to be heavily plundered, so during the Twenty-first Dynasty the priests of Amun opened most of the tombs and moved the mummies into three tombs in order to better protect them. Most of the treasure was removed from the tombs. Most of these were later moved to a single cache near Deir el-Bahari (known as TT320). Located in the cliffs overlooking the Mortuary Temple of Hatshepsut, this mass reburial contained a large number of royal mummies. They were found in a great state of disorder, many placed in other's coffins, and several are still unidentified. Other mummies were moved to the tomb of Amenhotep II, where over a dozen mummies, many of them royal, were later relocated.

During the later Third Intermediate Period and later periods, intrusive burials were introduced into many of the open tombs. In Coptic times, some of the tombs were used as churches, stables, and even houses.

=== Minor tombs in the Valley of the Kings ===
The majority of the 65 numbered tombs in the Valley of the Kings can be considered as minor tombs, either because at present they have yielded little information or because the results of their investigations were only poorly recorded by their explorers. Some have received very little attention or were only cursorily noted. Most of these tombs are small, often consisting of only a single burial chamber accessed by a shaft or staircase with a corridor or a series of corridors leading to the chamber.

Nonetheless, some are larger, multiple-chambered tombs. These minor tombs served various purposes: some were intended for burials of lesser royalty or private burials, some contained animal burials, and others apparently never received a primary burial. In many cases these tombs also served secondary functions, and later intrusive material has been found related to these secondary activities. While some of these tombs have been open since antiquity, the majority were discovered in the 19th and early 20th centuries during the height of exploration in the valley.

=== Tomb robbers ===
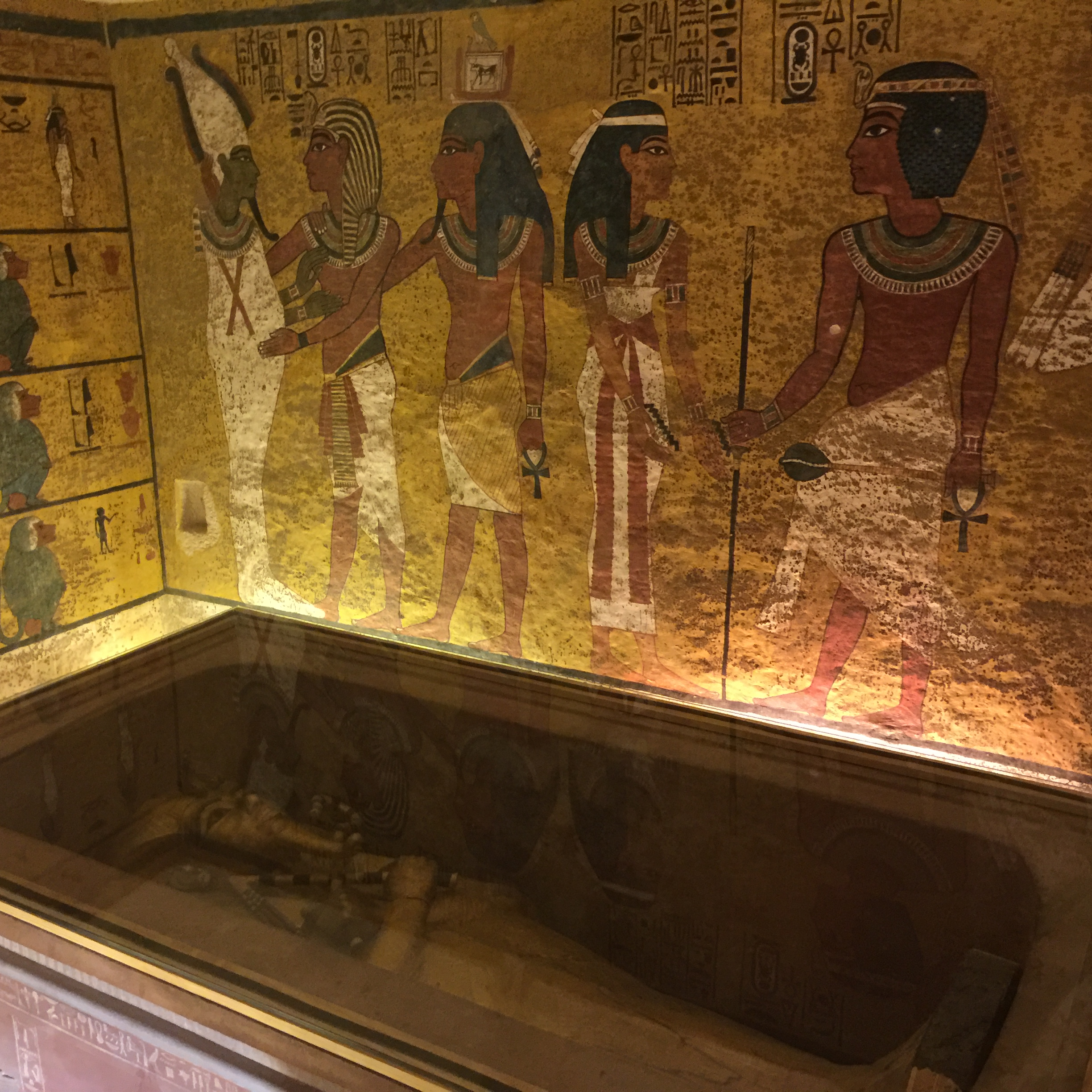
KV62 found undisturbed in 1922

Almost all tombs throughout Egypt have been robbed. Several papyri have been found that describe the trials of tomb robbers. These date mostly from the late Twentieth Dynasty. One of these, Papyrus Mayer B, describes the robbery of the tomb of Ramesses VI and was probably written during year eight or nine of Ramesses X, around 1118 BC. Papyrus BM 10053 from Year 17 of Ramesses IX records that 8 of the workmen of Deir el-Medina had "been apprehended by the local authorities somewhere within the west Theban necropolis, and [were] duly escorted across the river to the main city of Thebes." The workmen were interrogated for robbing a royal tomb--that of Queen Isis, Ramesses III's chief royal wife. They then disappear from history and were presumably executed by impalement for their crimes.

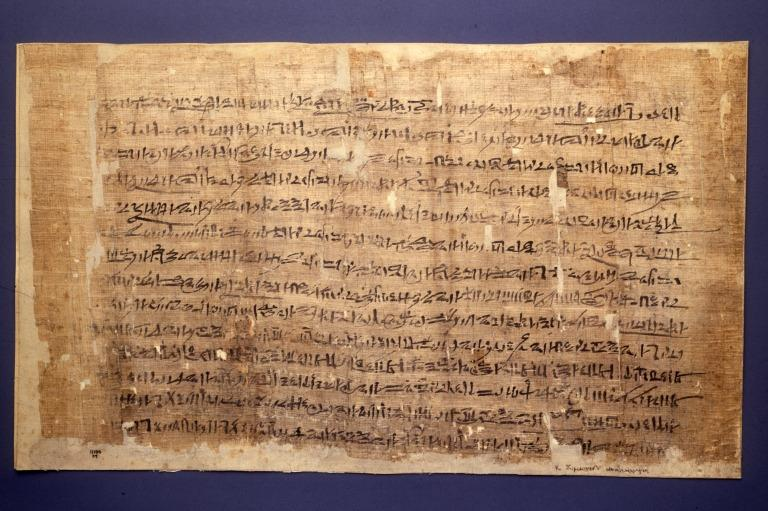
Papyrus Mayer B. The script is the common hieratic of the 20th Dynasty and consists of 14 lines of writing. It records theft in the tomb of Ramesses VI.

The foreigner Nesamun took us up and showed us the tomb of King Ramesses VI ... And I spent four days breaking into it, we being present all five. We opened the tomb and entered it. ... We found a cauldron of bronze, three wash bowls of bronze ...

Confessing to their crimes, the thief goes on to add that a small quarrel arose amongst the robbers when it came to equally dividing the spoils collected from the tomb.

Tombs were filled with valuables, therefore a prime motivation to rob them. Thieves often looted the chambers and bodies of mummies and took with them precious metals and stones, the most common gold and silver, linens and ointments or unguents. Often tombs were robbed when they were still fresh because many of the valuables buried with the mummies were perishable.

The valley also seems to have suffered an official plundering during the virtual civil war, which started during the reign of Ramesses XI. The tombs were opened, all the valuables were removed, and the mummies were collected into two large caches. One in the tomb of Amenhotep II, contained sixteen mummies, and others were hidden within Amenhotep I's tomb. A few years later most of them were moved to the Deir el-Bahari cache, containing no fewer than forty royal mummies and their coffins. Only tombs whose locations were lost (KV62, KV63, KV46 and KV54, although both KV62 and KV46 were robbed soon after their actual closure) were undisturbed during this period.

Tombs were ransacked for their valuables but also for their original primary purpose. Once robbed, an empty tomb could be used as a burial place for another mummy, which is exactly what happened in the smallest of the pyramids of Giza.

== Tourism ==
Most of the tombs are not open to the public (18 of the tombs can be opened, but they are rarely open at the same time), and officials occasionally close those that are open for restoration work. The number of visitors to KV62 has led to a separate charge for entry into the tomb. The West Valley has only one open tomb – that of Ay – and a separate ticket is needed to visit this tomb. The tour guides are no longer allowed to lecture inside the tombs, and visitors are expected to proceed quietly and in single file through the tombs. This is to minimize time in the tombs and prevent the crowds from damaging the surfaces of the decoration.

In 1997, 58 tourists and four Egyptians were massacred at nearby Deir el-Bahari by Islamist militants from Al-Gama'a al-Islamiyya. This led to an overall drop in tourism in the area.

On most days of the week an average of 4,000 to 5,000 tourists visit the main valley. The West Valley is much less visited, as there is only one tomb that is open to the public.

== See also ==
- Royal Wadi and tombs – Burial place of Akhenaten and his royal family.
- Naqsh-e Rostam – Persian "Valley of the Kings" royal tombs.
- Ming and Qing Imperial Tombs – Royal tombs of the Ming and Qing Dynasties.
- Sacred Valley (Peru)
- Burial place of Genghis Khan – An undiscovered place of burial of Genghis Khan and his royal family.
- Valley of the Kings (Tibet)
- Petra – Wadi lined with rock-cut buildings, which are mainly tombs.
