= James Burton (Egyptologist) =

British Egyptologist (1786–1862)

James Burton Junior FGS
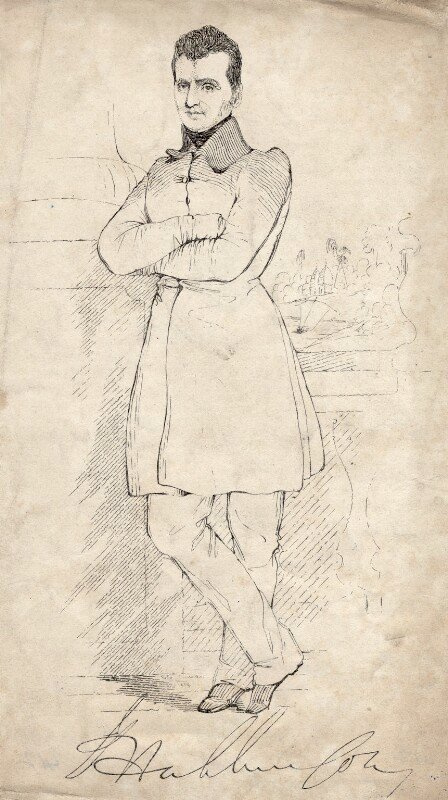
- Born: James Haliburton; 22 September 1786; Crescent Place (now Burton Place), Bloomsbury, London
- Died: 22 February 1862 (aged 75); 10 Hamilton Place, Newington, Edinburgh
- Resting place: Dean Cemetery, Edinburgh
- Education: Tonbridge School
- Alma mater: Trinity College, Cambridge, Lincoln's Inn
- Occupation: Egyptologist
- Parents: James Burton (father); Elizabeth Westley (mother)
- Relatives: Decimus Burton (brother); Henry Burton (brother); Henry Marley Burton (nephew); Thomas Chandler Haliburton (cousin); Robert Grant Haliburton (cousin); Arthur Lawrence Haliburton, 1st Baron Haliburton (cousin)

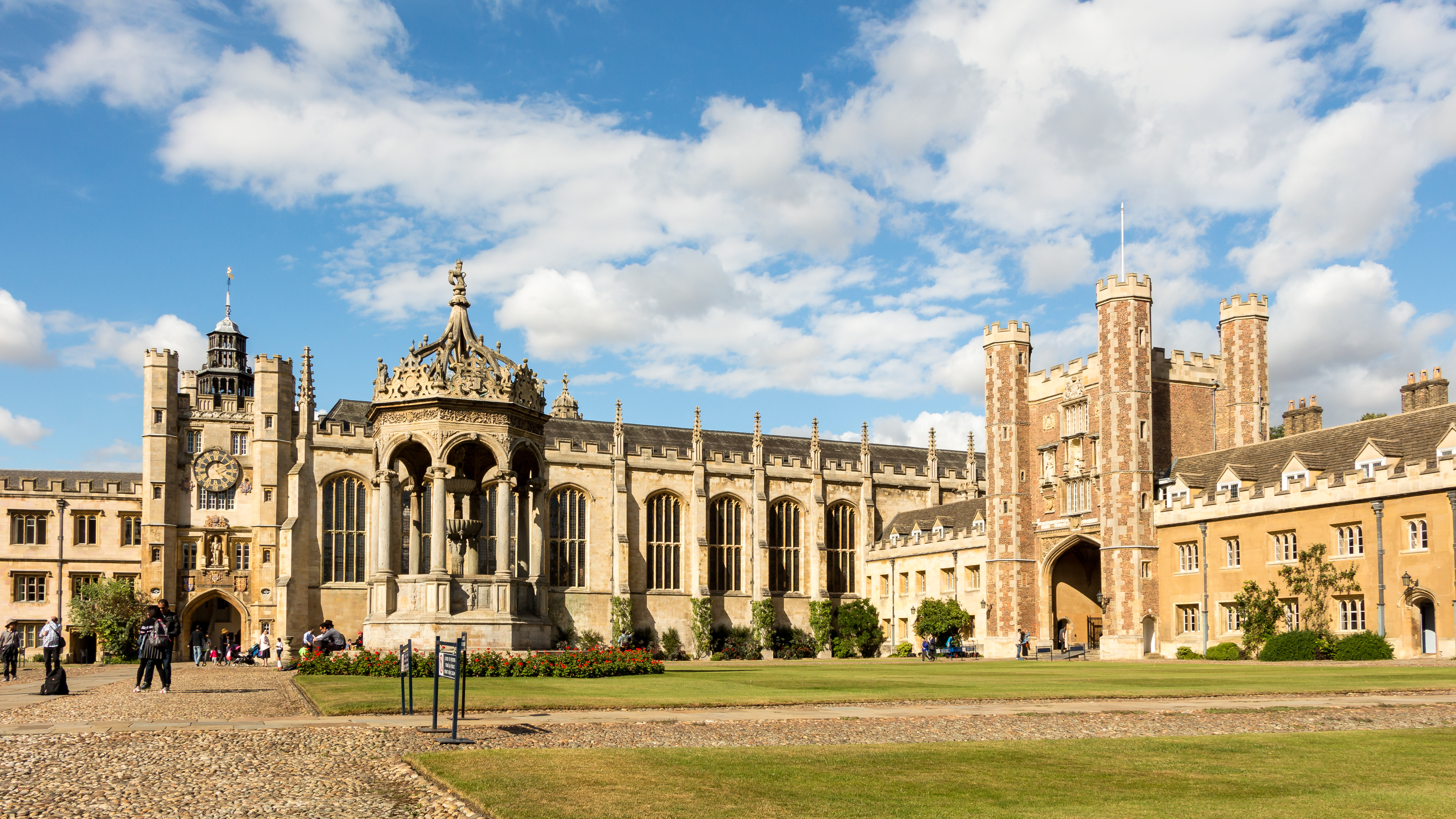
Trinity College, Cambridge

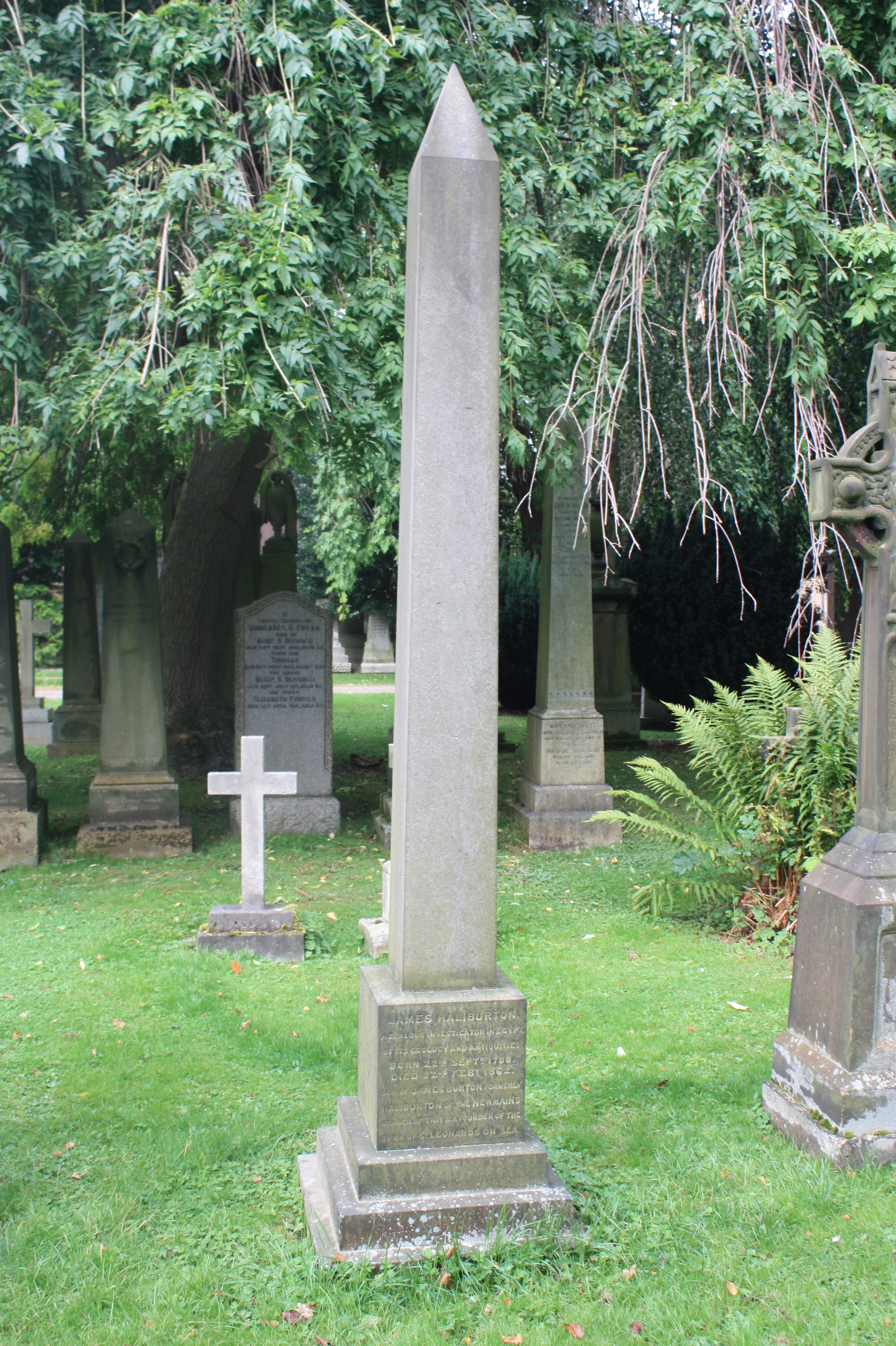
John Haliburton's grave, Dean Cemetery, Edinburgh

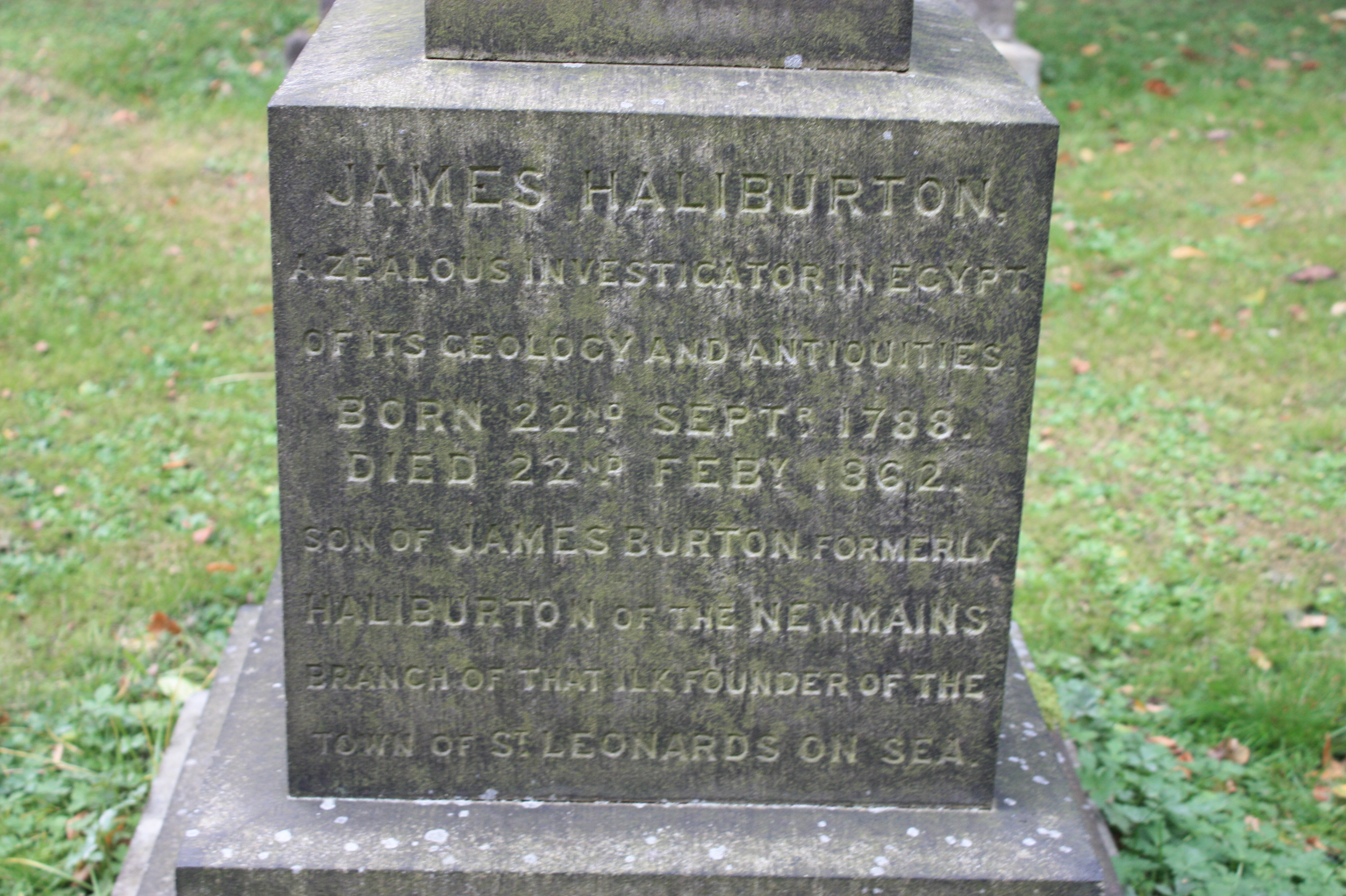
The inscription on James Haliburton's grave, Dean Cemetery

James Burton Junior FGS (22 September 1786 – 22 February 1862) (formerly Haliburton and latterly Haliburton) was a British libertine and pioneering Egyptologist who mapped the Valley of the Kings; and was the first post-Renaissance person to enter KV5; and was the discoverer of the Karnak king list; and was the discoverer of TT391.

== Family ==
James Burton Junior, who was born at Crescent Place (now Burton Place), Bloomsbury, London, was the fourth child and second son of the pre-eminent London property developer James Burton Senior (who was formerly surnamed Haliburton) by Elizabeth Westley (12 December 1761 – 14 January 1837) of Loughton. He was christened 'James Haliburton' but his father changed the family surname to Burton in 1794.

James Burton Junior changed his surname to Burton, but changed his surname back to Haliburton in 1838.

He was an elder brother of the architect Decimus Burton; and of the physician Henry Burton. He was a cousin and friend of the Canadian author and British MP Thomas Chandler Haliburton: and thereby of the Canada First founder Robert Grant Haliburton and the civil servant Arthur Lawrence Haliburton, 1st Baron Haliburton.

His great-great grandparents were The Rev. James Haliburton (1681 – 1756) and Margaret Eliott, who was the daughter of Sir William Eliott, 2nd Baronet and the aunt of George Augustus Eliott, 1st Baron Heathfield. He descended from John Haliburton (1573 – 1627), from whom Sir Walter Scott, 1st Baronet also was descended.

He impressed Susanna Haliburton Weldon, who was the daughter of his cousin Thomas Chandler Haliburton, whom and whose father he hosted and entertained when she and her father resided in England from 1837. Susanna wrote, in 1839, "Mr James I admire very much. He is one of the most well-bred persons I saw &... decidedly the flower of the flock". Thomas Chandler Haliburton in 1839 asked Burton to check the proofs of his work Letter Bag of the Great Western, with which Burton was unimpressed, and in 1840 those of the third series of The Clockmaker. James Burton Junior travelled with Thomas Chandler Haliburton to Scotland to investigate their in-common ancestry, and intended to tour Canada and the United States of America together.

== Education ==
James Burton Junior was privately tutored before he was educated at Tonbridge School; and at Trinity College, Cambridge (BA, 1810: MA, 1815) at which he read mathematics under George Frederick Tavel; and at Middle Temple and Lincoln's Inn.

== Egyptology and Decadence ==
He between 1815 and 1822 worked with the architects Sir John Soane and Charles Humphreys, the latter of whom became his secretary. He met the Egyptologists Sir John Gardner Wilkinson, and Edward William Lane, Sir William Gell. His cadre of Egyptologists also included Robert Hay and Joseph Bonomi the Younger.

He lived in Egypt from 1820 to 1834, where he enjoyed marsala, rum, brandy, opium, and the company of slave-girls. His team discovered TT391 during 1820. In 1822, he was invited by Pasha Mohammed Ali to work as a mineralogist, in the Geological Survey of Egypt, to discover coal, that he left in 1824 to investigate ancient monuments. He discovered the Ancient Roman porphyry quarry of the Romans and the site of Myos Hormos on the coast of the Red Sea. In 1825, he travelled south on the Nile. He spent months in Thebes, where he camped in the Memnonium, studied the surrounding monuments, and excavated at Medinet Habu, Valley of the Kings, Abu Simbel, and Karnak, including its Temple of Amun-Ra, of which he drew the plan, and its Granite Sanctuary, where he found the Karnak king list which provided information that was not included in the Abydos king list.

He made the first attempt to excavate KV20 that cleared its first chamber, and he mapped KV21. He also explored KV26, KV9, KV19, and KV2. In 1825, he became the first post-Renaissance person to enter KV5, but explored only its first chambers.

He returned to Cairo and between 1825 and 1828 published the four parts of the Excerpta Hieroglyphica, which was a volume of hieroglyphic inscriptions, with assistance of Charles Humphreys, Joseph Bonomi the Younger, Lord Prudhoe, and Orlando Felix (1790 - 1860). In 1828 he found the trilingual inscription known as the Caristie stone which subsequently was kept in the Louvre.

He between 1825 and 1834 stayed in the Egyptian desert for nine years until his father discontinued his funds and he was compelled to return to London in 1834. None of his explorations from that period have been published, but the papers of his companion George Bellas Greenough, which are kept at University College, London, provide information about Burton's life: "Besides his black slaves before mentioned he has a young Greek purchased by a Scotch renegade by the name of Osman", wrote Sheffield, another Egyptologist. At a birthday celebration for Charles Humphrey, Burton drank 'till he fell off his chair'. Burton had 'a superb French bed with a long looking glass' and spent most his time in 'coffee, smoking, and drinking spiritous mixtures' in 'his divan - his harem'.

Burton contracted ophthalmia, lumbago, liver problems, and a scorbutic infection, and consumed opium 'to so great a degree' that his friends feared his 'speedy madness or death'. One of his friends wrote of him, 'He is reduced to a mere skeleton'.

He returned to England on Christmas Day 1834 with animals, including a giraffe that slipped on ice and died at Calais, and servants, including Andreana who was a Greek slave-girl whom he employed as a translator of Turkish, and whom he married, for which he was disowned by his father. However, after his death, his wife Andreana (c. 1813 - 1883), who outlived him by 22 years, was offered an allowance by his family in return for her renouncement of any claim to their estate.

== Last 24 years in England ==
Most of his collection of Egyptian antiquities and books in Arabic were auctioned at Sotheby's in 1836 to repay his debts, and many of them were purchased by Lord Prudhoe and the British Museum. One of his mummies and cartonnage was retained by George Bellas Greenough and displayed in a 'Mummy Room' at the same's house in the Regent's Park, before it was sold to the banker Edmund Hopkinson, who was married to Burton's sister Octavia, and was displayed at the same's home in Gloucestershire before being donated to the Gloucester Museum. It is now in the Liverpool Museum.

He wrote the text for Illustrations of Cairo (1840). He was a Fellow of the Geological Society of London. He lived with his brothers until the 1860s.

He died at 10 Hamilton Place, Newington, on 22 February 1862. Robert Hay was an executor of his will. His wife Andreana (c. 1813 - 1883) outlived him by 22 years. Subsequent to his death, his retained notebooks, of drawings and plans of Egyptian antiquities and monuments, were given to the British Museum by his brother Decimus Burton.

He is buried near the centre of West Dean Cemetery in Edinburgh, where his epitaph reads "a zealous investigator in Egypt of its geology and antiquities".

== Sources ==
- Cooke, Neil M. R. (23 September 2004). "Haliburton [Haliburton; formerly Burton], James". Oxford Dictionary of National Biography (online ed.). Oxford University Press. doi:10.1093/ref:odnb/11926. (Subscription, Wikipedia Library access or UK public library membership required.)
- Davies, Richard A. (2005). Inventing Sam Slick: A Biography of Thomas Chandler Haliburton. University of Toronto Press. pp. 71–73. ISBN 978-0-8020-5001-4.
- Haliburton, James (1825). Excerpta Hieroglyphica. Cairo.
- Reeves, Carl Nicholas (1990). Valley of the Kings: The Decline of a Royal Necropolis. K. Paul International. ISBN 978-0-7103-0368-4.
