= Henry Burton (physician) =

English physician who discovered the Burton line

Henry Burton FRCP M.D. M.L. M.D. B.S.
- Born: 27 February 1799
- Died: 10 August 1849 (aged 50)
- Education: Tonbridge School; Gonville and Caius College, Cambridge; St Bartholomew's Hospital
- Occupations: Physician, chemist
- Known for: Burton line
- Spouse: Mary Elizabeth Poulton (m. 1826)
- Parents: James Burton (property developer) (father); Elizabeth Westley (1761 – 1837) (mother)
- Relatives: Decimus Burton (brother); James Burton (Egyptologist) (brother); Thomas Chandler Haliburton (cousin); Arthur Lawrence Haliburton, 1st Baron Haliburton (cousin)

Henry Burton FRCP (27 February 1799 – 10 August 1849) was a British physician and chemist, who identified that blue discolouration of gums, the eponymous Burton line, was a symptom of lead poisoning.

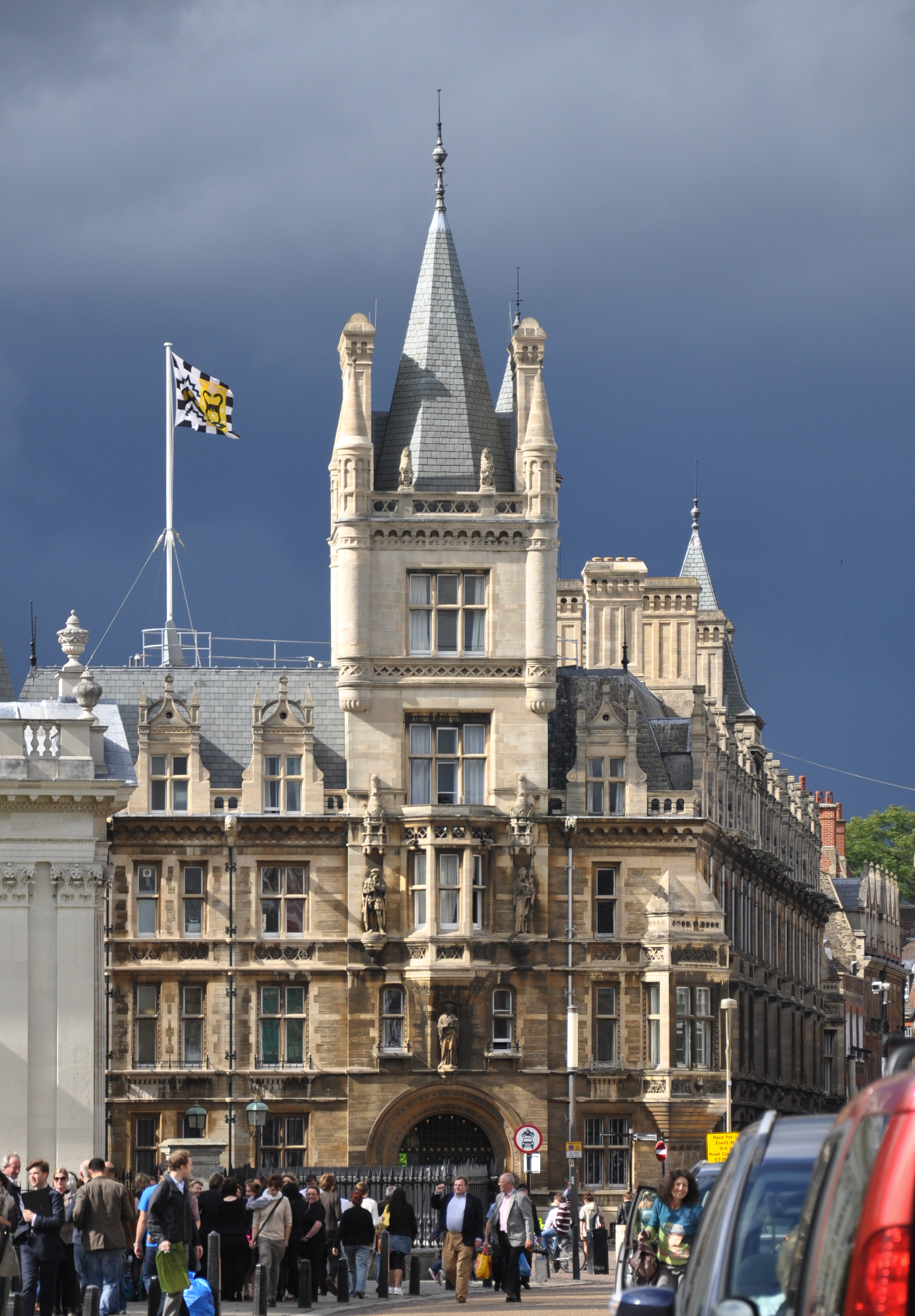
Gonville and Caius College, Cambridge

== Family ==
Henry Burton was a son of the pre-eminent London property developer James Burton and Elizabeth Westley (1761 – 1837). He was a brother of the gunpowder-manufacturer William Ford Burton, of the Egyptologist, James Burton, and of the architect Decimus Burton.

As the Cambridge Alumni Database identifies, some sources, including the entry for Henry Burton in the Royal College of Physicians's Lives of the Fellows, incorrectly state that Henry Burton was the son of one ‘John Burton’. This is incorrect: he was the son of the aforementioned London property developer James Burton.

His paternal great-great grandparents were The Rev. James Haliburton (1681 – 1756) and Margaret Eliott, who was the daughter of Sir William Eliott, 2nd Baronet, and the aunt of George Augustus Eliott, 1st Baron Heathfield. Henry was descended from John Haliburton (1573–1627), from whom Sir Walter Scott, 1st Baronet traced maternal descent.

He was a cousin of the Canadian author and British MP Thomas Chandler Haliburton: and thereby of the Canada First founder Robert Grant Haliburton and the civil servant Arthur Lawrence Haliburton, 1st Baron Haliburton.

== Career ==
Henry was educated at Tonbridge School; and at Gonville and Caius College, Cambridge, at which he received the degrees M.B., M.L., M.D., B.S., and at St Bartholomew's Hospital.

He served on the 98-gun HMS Boyne before he entered the Gunpowder Office.

In September 1825, he became Professor of Chemistry at St Thomas' Hospital, where he became Senior Physician. He became a Fellow of the Royal College of Physicians in 1832. He was appointed Censor of the Royal College of Physicians in 1838 and Consiliarius in 1843. He is famous for his discovery that a blue line on the gums, the eponymous Burton line, was a symptom of lead poisoning.

== Marriage ==
Henry Burton married Mary Elizabeth, who was the daughter of William Poulton of Maidenhead, at St. George's, Bloomsbury, in 1826. She died in 1829, without issue, and Henry did not remarry. Henry lived at 41 Jermyn Street, London, and 58 Marina, St. Leonard's-on-Sea.
