= John Weldon =

John Weldon may refer to:

- John Weldon (animator) (born 1945), Canadian animator
- John Weldon (musician) (1676–1736), British musician
- John Wesley Weldon (died 1885), lawyer, judge and political figure in the province of New Brunswick, Canada

== See also ==
- Brinsley MacNamara (1890–1963), Irish writer, born John Weldon
