= Leo Schuster =

German-British cotton trader and merchant banker

Leopold Schuster (1791 – 27 February 1871) was a German-born British cotton-trader and merchant banker, who was the Chairman of the London and Brighton Railway and of the London, Brighton and South Coast Railway, and a buyer of The Crystal Palace.

== Early career ==
The son of a cotton merchant, he moved to England in 1808, and in 1820 formed the trading company Leo Schuster, Brothers & Co., cotton merchants based in Manchester, Bradford and Liverpool. Like many German Jews in Northwest England at the time, he converted to Unitarianism.

== Merchant banker ==
In 1855 he moved to London, and formed the merchant bank Schuster Sons & Co. in Cannon Street, City of London. Through this he became involved in financing various railway ventures, and was Chairman of the London and Brighton Railway. As chairman he negotiated the tripartite merger to form the new London, Brighton and South Coast Railway, which he became deputy chairman of to his friend Samuel Laing.

=== Chairman, LB&SCR ===
After Laing retired at the end of 1855 to pursue a political career, Schuster replaced him as chairman of the LB&SCR, instituting a policy of rapidly expanding new routes throughout South London, Sussex, and East Surrey. Some of these routes were financed and built by the company itself, while others were built by independent local companies, set up with the intention of connecting their town to the growing railway network, and with the intention of sale or lease to the LB&SCR. Schuster accelerated the speed of mileage increase after appointing Frederick Banister as the new Chief Engineer in 1860. Resultantly, between 1857 and 1865 a further 177 miles (285 km) were constructed or authorised.

The growth of the LB&SCR came to a halt in 1866 with the collapse of London bankers Overend, Gurney and Company. The subsequent UK financial crisis the following year brought the railway to the brink of bankruptcy. A special meeting of shareholders was adjourned, and the powers of the Board of Directors were suspended pending receipt of a report into the financial affairs of the company and its prospects. The report made clear that the railway had over-extended itself with large capital projects sustained by profits from its passenger traffic, which suddenly declined as a result of the crisis. Several of the country lines were losing money, and resultantly in restructuring the company Schuster was forced to resign in favour of new chairman Peter Northall Lawrie.

=== Crystal Palace ===
In the 1850s, Schuster and Laing were both members of a consortium of eight men who bought The Crystal Palace and relocated the building to south London at Sydenham Hill. The consortium persuaded the board of the LB&SCR to build a new Crystal Palace railway station to service the new location and it opened in 1854.

== Personal life ==
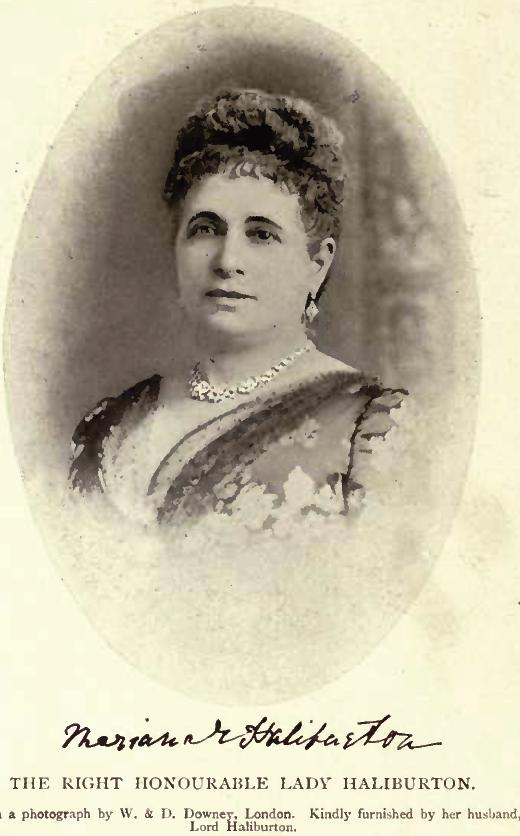
Mariana Emily Lady Haliburton by W. & D. Downey

His elder son, by his first wife Emilie, who was the daughter of M. L. Getz of Frankfurt, was Samuel Leo Schuster (11 May 1830 – 23 December 1884) who married the eldest daughter of the 5th Earl of Orkney. His daughter Mariana Emily Schuster married the baronet Sir William Dickason Clay and, after Clay's death, subsequently Arthur Haliburton, 1st Baron Haliburton.

By his second marriage to Mary Howard, which occurred in 1845, Leo had two more daughters and a second son who was the arts-patron Leo Francis Howard Schuster (1852 - 1927). He was the uncle of the financier Sir Felix Schuster and Sir Francis Schuster.

His estate on his death was valued at over £500,000.
