= Francis Arundale =

British artist (1807–1853)

Francis Arundale (9 August 1807 – 9 September 1853) was an English architectural draughtsman.

== Life ==
Arundale was born in London. He studied under Augustus Pugin, and accompanied him to Normandy, making drawings for a description which Pugin published of the tour. In 1831 Arundale visited Egypt with Mr. Hay, and in 1833 he joined Frederick Catherwood and Joseph Bonomi the Younger on their tour to the Holy Land, filling many portfolios with drawings of the interesting monuments and ruins of Palestine. He subsequently visited France and Italy, and spent several winters in Rome. He made drawings of objects of interest in the cities of Italy, in Greece, Sicily, and Asia Minor. He executed a few oil paintings from his Eastern sketches.

Arundale died at Brighton in 1853.

== Illustrated books ==
- Selected Specimens of the Edifices of Palladio (1832).
- Illustrations of Jerusalem and Mount Sinai (Henry Colburn, 1837).
- Benjamin Vale, Francis Arundale, Joseph Bonomi. The Early History of Egypt (1857).
