= Bismuthia =

Medical condition

Bismuthia is a rare dermatological condition that results from the prolonged use of bismuth.

Much more rarely than with silver, bismuth may produce a generalized persistent skin discoloration resembling argyria. The conjunctivae and oral mucosa, as well as skin, are commonly afflicted by the condition. Pigment granules are evenly scattered through the dermis, producing a blue, or bluish gray skin color by the scattering phenomenon. It is extremely rare, and as a consequence is poorly understood by modern medicine. Special stains and spectroscopic methods must be utilized for identification of skin pigments affected by bismuth.

Usually, bismuth produces a black line, due to bismuth sulfide, along the gums, near the teeth, similar to the Burton's line which can be found in lead poisoning. This is not likely to occur if the gum is edentulous or the gum and the teeth normal. It is more common when gingivitis and carious teeth are present. Bismuth excess may cause stomatitis. On even rarer occasions, bismuth has been reported to cause pigmentation of the vagina and cervix.
