= Novascotian =

Newspaper in Nova Scotia, Canada

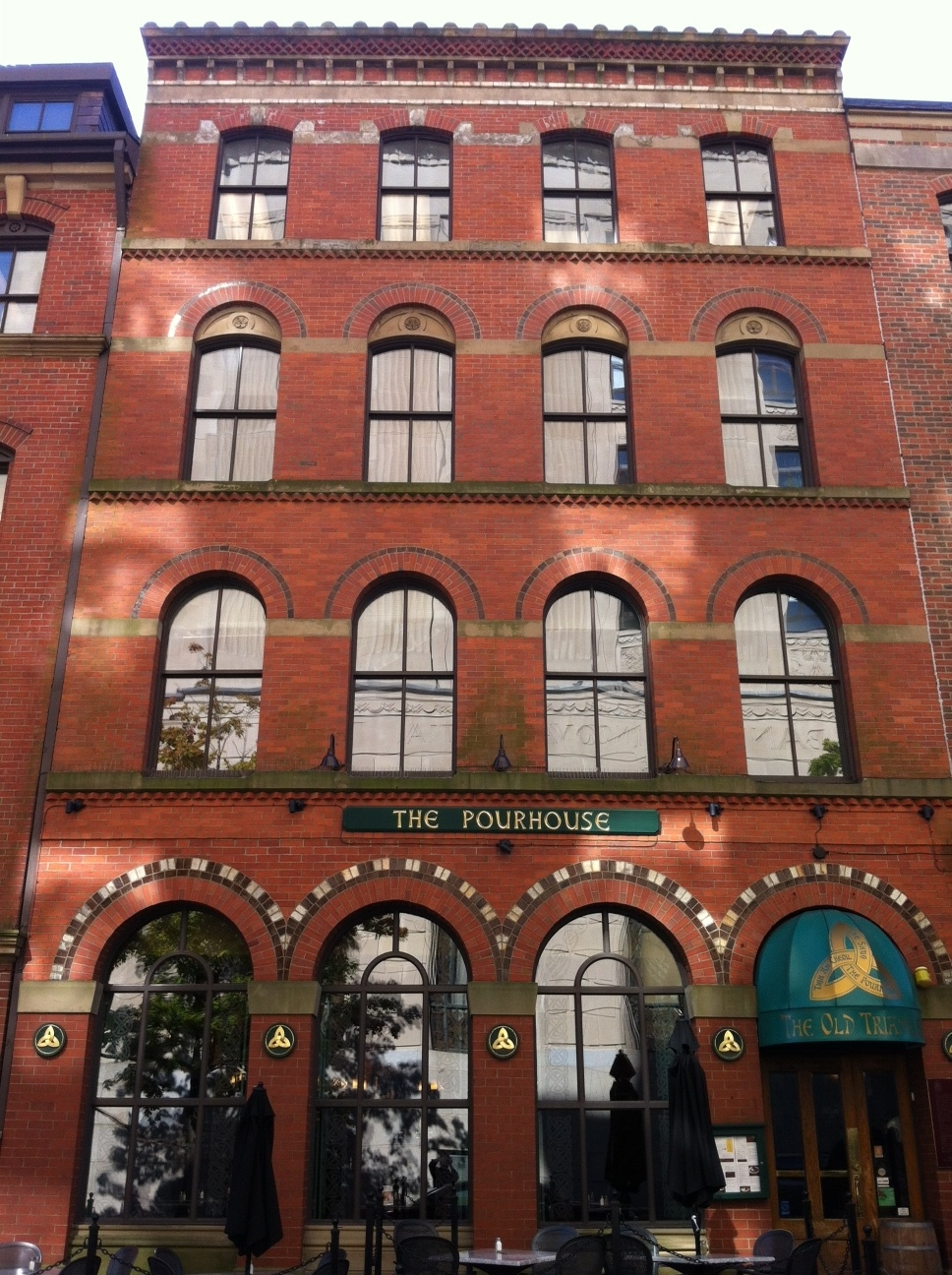
Novascotian Building (1862), Founders Square, Prince St., Halifax, Nova Scotia

The Novascotian was a newspaper published in Halifax, Nova Scotia, Canada. It became one of the most influential voices in the British North American colonies in its nearly one century of existence.

The paper was founded as the Nova Scotian or Colonial Herald by George R. Young, in 1824. Joseph Howe took control of it in 1827, establishing the paper's motto: "The free constitution which guards the British press." Published as a weekly, the paper played a key role in the intellectual and political life of Nova Scotia. A letter published in the Novascotian in 1835 led to charges of libel against Howe. When acquitted, he proclaimed: "the Press of Nova Scotia is free."

With a circulation of 3000 subscribers, the Novascotian became the leading provincial newspaper in the 1840s. A well-known contributor was Thomas Chandler Haliburton, creator of the immensely popular character Sam Slick. Howe's entry into politics necessitated selling the paper. Nevertheless, the Novascotian remained a liberal voice in the province until the First World War, reaching a peak circulation of 20,000. Later it was published as the Nova Scotian and then Nova Scotia's Farm and Home Journal. It was discontinued in the 1920s after years of dwindling circulation following a change of its political allegiances to the Union Government.

The name Novascotian is still in use. It is now printed as a human interest section of The Chronicle-Herald newspaper of Halifax.

== The early years, 1824-1831 ==
The paper was founded as the Novascotian or Colonial Herald by George Renny Young in 1824. Young had a very respectable circulation due to the ability of him and his writers as well as the great newspaper industry emerging at the time. Towards the end of 1827, Young was showing waning interest in the running of his newspaper, because he wanted to become a lawyer, so on January 3, 1828, he sold the Novascotian to Joseph Howe for 1050 pounds, making Howe the sole editor and owner.

The initial reaction to Howe running the Novascotian was poor. Many of its readers withdrew their subscriptions, believing that Howe was too young, unskilled and inexperienced to run a newspaper. Howe indeed was only 23 years old when he purchased the Novascotian and had had no regular education as it had not been possible for him to walk to school in the winter. However, Howe had been working in the office of the Royal Gazette since he was 13 years old, and during the months he could not go to school he had books to study, and his father, who for many years worked in the offices of the King's Printer and Postmaster-General of the Lower Provinces, to talk to.

Howe overcame the difficulties he faced with the Novascotian, due to his willingness to travel, network and expand his own knowledge:

- Howe read British, foreign, and colonial newspapers daily.
- Howe reported on the debates in the House of Assembly and important trials in the courts with his own hand.
- Howe was in a position to mingle with nearly all the public men of the day.
- Howe travelled all over inland districts and to seaport towns, taking in the surroundings and making many acquaintances.
- Howe read political literature of all countries which expressed their opinions in English.

It was with this gained knowledge that Howe moved to shape his newspaper. Howe had a vision for the Novascotian; it was his mission to, "furnish the readers all that properly came under the heading of news, whether British, Colonial, American, or European." Howe wanted to get all of the news to the people. He did not want the Novascotian to have an affiliation with any one political party or government because it was for the people.

Howe's critics would have appeared to have been correct during the first year of Howe's Novascotian, because he had started it with almost no politics or editorial commentary. There were, however, some interesting submissions which had shown some promise. On July 24, 1828 Howe introduced "Western Rambles", a series which gave the Novascotian's readers an insight into the Western part of their own country. The series ran until October 9, 1828. From December 1829 until August, 1831, Howe "Eastern Rambles", a series that presented a perspective from the Eastern part of British North America.

== Political influence, 1832-1835 ==
The Novascotian started to become more politically involved in the following couple of years, gaining significant influence as it went. The title page of the Novascotian always read the same motto, "The Constitution, the whole Constitution, and nothing but the Constitution." This showed that Howe wanted his newspaper to be nonpartisan in all matters, which was unique compared to the other newspapers printed at the time. The Novascotian would support the Government in their actions if they were right for doing so, and would warn the People when the actions of the Government were not proper.

During the late 1820s and early 1830s, as newspapers grew so did their confidence in terms of the reporting of political events, embracing the concept of public argument and conversation over political issues. It was during this time that the Novascotian evolved into the outspoken and combative newspaper that it was. On July 8, 1829, Howe introduced a section in the Novascotian entitled "Legislative Reviews". The Novascotian was the first newspaper in Nova Scotia and one of the first newspapers in all of British North America to give regular reports on what went on within the House of Assembly. This was monumental for the citizens of Nova Scotia and for British North America as a whole. It was Howe's opinion without the Novascotian's reports on the legislative assembly, British North America would have limited knowledge of what went on in the meetings in which decisions were made that directly affected all British North Americans.

The Novascotian was the cutting edge of the time when it came to the development of political conversation. This was because Howe was the first to give regular reports on the House of Assembly and opened up his newspaper to the voices of the public through letters. Also, the Novascotian, despite all of the political discussion and criticism that would be published, it was not the most radical newspaper in Nova Scotia at the time: The Colonial Patriot was even more critical and daring in their discussion of political issues. This was beneficial to Howe and the Novascotian because it meant that he was less likely to be targeted by the government for charges of libel. However, the Colonial Patriot folded in 1834, leaving the Novascotian as the most radical newspaper in Nova Scotia. This increase in political involvement climaxed on January 1, 1835, when Howe published a letter, signed 'The People', in the Novascotian that denounced the current local magistrates of Halifax.

== Joseph Howe's criminal libel trial of 1835 ==
During the year 1834, Howe was starting to attract attention to himself due to his strong independent viewpoints in his editorials in the Novascotian, the Government was starting to take notice. Howe had eventually reached his breaking point and in late 1834, wrote in the Novascotian that he was going to start a campaign in the interest of bringing to light the wrongful actions of government. On January 1, 1835, the final piece of this campaign was published in the Novascotian, a letter signed "The People".

This letter accused the magistrates of "reprehensible irresponsibility, incompetence, and self-interestedness in the conduct of their responsibilities." Because the letter was published, Howe was put on trial for seditious libel, being charged with "seditiously contriving, devising, and intending to stir up and incite discontent and sedition among His Majesty's subjects." The crime of seditious libel had been defined 200 years prior to the time of Howe's trial and was seen by many as an unfair crime as it could be as broad or as specific as the court chose.

If Howe had been convicted of seditious libel, the Novascotian would have been shut down. Howe represented himself in the trial and presented nothing but a 6 h 15 min speech against the charge. The jury took 10 min to decide to acquit Howe on the charge of criminal libel.

The victory of Howe in the court was considered monumental at the time. In the first issue of the Novascotian following the acquittal, Howe claimed that "the press of Nova-Scotia is Free." It is said that Howe's libel victory established the fundamental basis for the freedom of the press in Canada, but other scholars have offered contrary opinions.

== 1840 to present ==
With a circulation of 3000 subscribers, the Novascotian became the leading provincial newspaper in the 1840s. A well-known contributor was Thomas Chandler Haliburton, creator of the immensely popular character, Sam Slick. Howe's entry into politics necessitated selling the paper. Nevertheless, the Novascotian remained a liberal voice in the province until the First World War, reaching a peak circulation of 20,000. Later it was published as the Nova Scotian and then Nova Scotia's Farm and Home Journal. It was discontinued in the 1920s after years of dwindling circulation following a change of its political allegiances to the Union Government.

The name Novascotian is still in use. It is now printed as a human interest section of The Chronicle-Herald newspaper of Halifax.
