= Thomas Chandler Haliburton =

Nova Scotian politician (1796–1865)

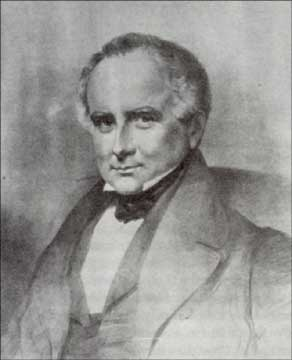
- Haliburton, c. 1836

Member of Parliament for Launceston
- In office 1859–1865
- Preceded by: Josceline Percy
- Succeeded by: Alexander Henry Campbell

Personal details
- Born: 17 December 1796 Windsor, Nova Scotia
- Died: 27 August 1865 (aged 68) Isleworth, England
- Party: Conservative Party (UK)
- Spouses: Louisa Neville (m. 1816; died 1840) Sarah Harriet Owen Williams (m. 1856)
- Children: Lord Haliburton; Robert Grant Haliburton *Susanna Haliburton Weldon
- Parent: William Hersey Otis Haliburton (father)
- Relatives: James Burton (property developer) (cousin); James Burton (Egyptologist) (cousin); Henry Burton (physician) (cousin); Decimus Burton (cousin)

Thomas Chandler Haliburton (17 December 1796 – 27 August 1865) was a Nova Scotia-born judge, author, novelist, and Conservative MP in Britain. He was the first internationally bestselling fiction author from what is now Canada.

He was a cousin of the pre-eminent London property developer James Burton, whose sons James Burton Junior, the Egyptologist, and Decimus Burton, the architect, hosted him in London.

He was the father of the British civil servant Lord Haliburton, who was the first native Canadian to be raised to the Peerage of the United Kingdom, and of the anthropologist Robert Grant Haliburton, who founded the Canada First organization that contended that English Canadians were the "heirs of Aryan northmen" and that French Canadians were a "bar to progress".

== Life ==
Thomas Chandler Haliburton was born on 17 December 1796, in Windsor, Nova Scotia, to William Hersey Otis Haliburton, a judge and politician, and Lucy Chandler Grant. His mother died when he was a small child. When Thomas was seven, his father married Susanna Davis, the daughter of Michael Francklin who had been Nova Scotia's Lieutenant Governor.

He attended University of King's College in Windsor, from which he graduated in 1815 to become a lawyer who practiced at Annapolis Royal. Between 1826 and 1829, Haliburton represented Annapolis County in the Nova Scotia House of Assembly.

Haliburton's fame came from his writings on history, politics, farming, and from his The Clockmaker serialised novel,which first appeared in the Novascotian and was published throughout the British Empire, that described the humorous adventures of Sam Slick.

=== Relations with English Burton family ===
Thomas Chandler Haliburton resided in England from 1837, where he was hosted and entertained in London by his cousins Decimus Burton, Jane Burton, James Burton Junior the Egyptologist, Septimus Burton the solicitor, Octavia Burton, and Jessy Burton. Thomas asked James Burton Junior, to check the proofs of his work Letter Bag of the Great Western, with which Burton was unimpressed, in 1839, and those of the third series of The Clockmaker, in 1840. The pair travelled together to Scotland to investigate their in-common ancestry, and intended to tour Canada and the United States of America together. Thomas Chandler Haliburton's daughter, Susannah, was impressed by James Burton Junior: she wrote, in 1839, "Mr James I admire very much. He is one of the most well-bred persons I saw &... decidedly the flower of the flock".

=== Retirement and subsequent life ===
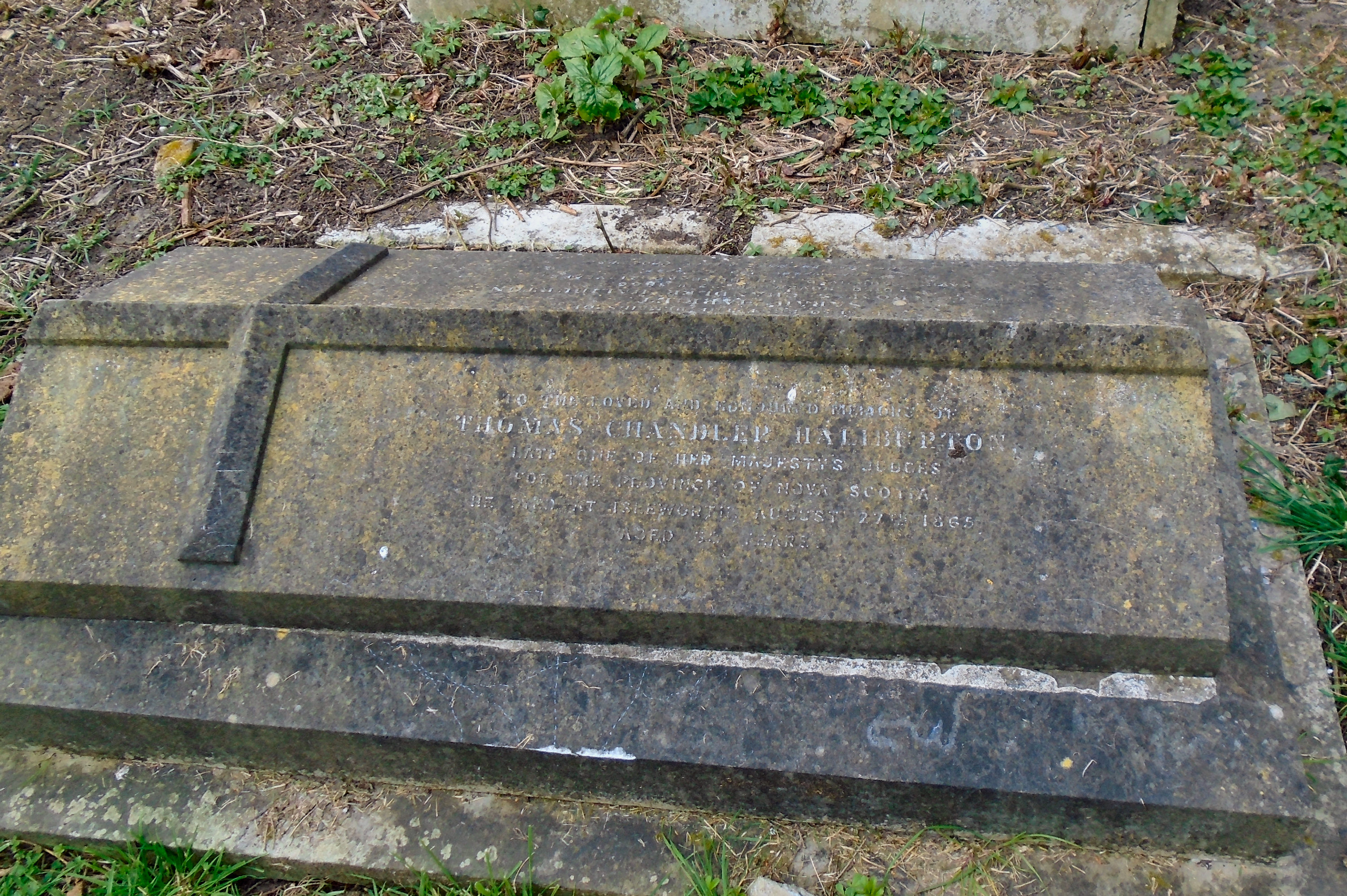
Isleworth, All Saints churchyard

In 1856, Thomas Chandler Haliburton retired from law and moved to England. In the same year, he married Sarah Harriet Owen Williams. In 1859, Haliburton was elected the Member of Parliament for Launceston, Cornwall as a member of the Conservative minority. He did not stand for re-election in 1865.

Haliburton received an honorary degree from Oxford for his services to literature. He continued writing until his death on August 27, 1865, at his home in Isleworth, where he is buried in its All Saints' Churchyard.

== Family ==
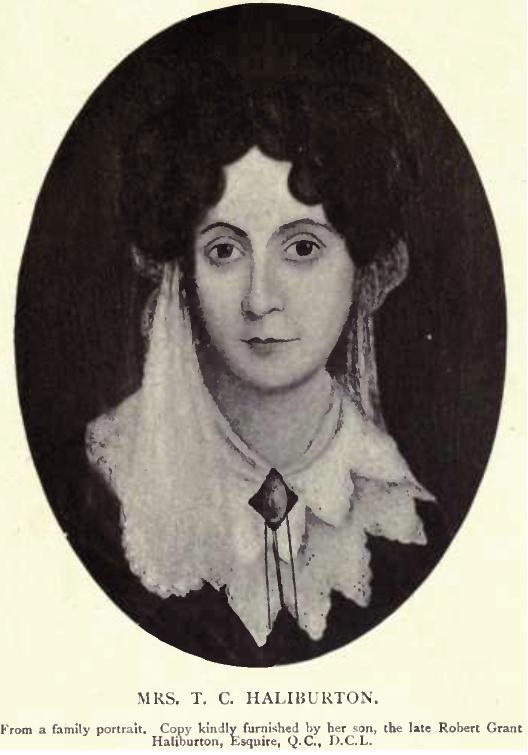
Mrs Louisa Haliburton (née Neville) first wife of Thomas Chandler Haliburton

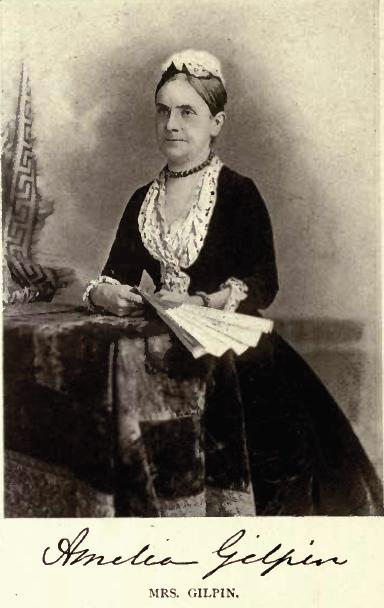
Daughter Amelia Gilpin by William Notman

Thomas Chandler Haliburton married Louisa Neville, who was the daughter of Captain Laurence Neville of the Eighth Light Dragoons, with whom he returned to Nova Scotia. Louisa's history before their marriage is related in the "Haliburton Chaplet," which was edited by their son Robert Grant Haliburton and published in Toronto in 1899. The couple had three sons and five daughters:

- Susannah Lucy Anne (later Weldon) (1817–1899), who was a significant ceramic collector.
- Thomas Jr., who became ill with an "original defect of mind" and died in an asylum in Massachusetts at the age of 26 years.
- Augusta F., who married an ironmonger.
- Emma, who married an Anglican clergyman of the surname Bainbridge Smith.
- Amelia (25 July 1829 – 14 January 1902), who was a landscape artist who married The Rev. Edwin Gilpin, Dean of Nova Scotia, in 1849, by whom she had four sons and one daughter including the author Edwin Gilpin (1850–1907).
- Robert Grant (1831–1901), who was a lawyer and anthropologist who founded the Canada First organization that contended that English Canadians were the "heirs of Aryan northmen" and that French Canadians were a "bar to progress".
- Laura Charlotte, who was an artist who married William Cunard, who was the son of the shipping magnate Sir Samuel Cunard, at Windsor, Nova Scotia, on 30 December 1851, by whom she had three sons and one daughter. She exhibited her pictures at the Royal Academy and at the Gallery of British Artists.
- Arthur (1832–1907), who was a British civil servant who was the first native Canadian to be raised to the Peerage of the United Kingdom, as 1st Baron Haliburton GCB.

== Legacy ==
Haliburton promoted immigration to the colonies of British North America, and one of his first written works was an emigrant's guide to Nova Scotia that was published in 1823 that was entitled A General Description of Nova Scotia; Illustrated by a New and Correct Map The community of Haliburton, Nova Scotia was named after him. In 1902, a memorial to Haliburton and his first wife was erected in Christ Church, Windsor, Nova Scotia, by their children.

In Ontario, Haliburton County is named after him because of his work as the first chairman of the Canadian Land and Emigration Company.

In 1884, faculty and students at his alma mater founded and named a literary society in his honour. The Haliburton Society remains active at the University of King's College, Halifax and is the longest-standing collegiate literary society in the Commonwealth of Nations and North America.

His mention of "hurly on the long pond on the ice", which appears in the second volume of The Attaché, or Sam Slick in England, a work of fiction published in 1844, has been interpreted by some as a reference to an ice-hockey-like game he may have played during his years at King's College. It is the basis of Windsor's disputed claim of being the town that fathered ice hockey.

Nova Scotian artist William Valentine painted Haliburton's portrait. His former home in Windsor is preserved as a museum.

== Works ==
- A General Description of Nova Scotia (1823)
- An Historical and Statistical Account of Nova Scotia (1829)
- The Clockmaker (1836)
- The Clockmaker (2nd Series; 1838)
- The Bubbles of Canada (1839)
- A Reply to the Report of the Earl of Durham (1839)
- The Letter-Bag of the Great Western (1840)
- The Clockmaker (3rd Series) (1840)
- The Attaché; or Sam Slick in England (1843)
- The Attaché; or Sam Slick in England (2nd Series; 1844)
- The Old Judge, or Life in a Colony (1849)
- The English in America (1851)
- Rule and Misrule in English America (1851) volume I and volume II
- Sam Slick's Wise Saws and Modern Instances; or, What He Said, Did, or Invented (1853)
- The Americans at Home; or, Byways, Backwoods, and Prairies (1855)
- Nature and Human Nature (1855)
- The Season-Ticket* (1860)
- Maxims of an Old Stager (using a pseudonym)

Parliament of the United Kingdom
Preceded by Lord Josceline Percy	Member of Parliament for Launceston; 1859–1865	Succeeded by Alexander Henry Campbell
