= Frank Schuster (music patron) =

English patron of arts (1852–1927)

Frank Schuster (24 September 1852 – 26 December 1927) was a British music-lover and patron of the arts. His home overlooking St James's Park at 22 Old Queen Street, London, part of which now contains offices of The Spectator magazine, became a meeting-place for artists, writers and musicians, including Siegfried Sassoon, John Singer Sargent, Walter Sickert, Sir Edward Elgar and Sir Adrian Boult. He was a particular patron of Edward Elgar, and also did much to make Gabriel Fauré's name known in England.

== Biography ==
Leo Francis Howard Schuster was born at 151 King's Road, Brighton and baptised at St John's parish church, Penge, Surrey, on 19 November 1852. He was the only son of Mary née Howard, Norfolk-born second wife of Leo Schuster, a Jewish German-born London banker and long a naturalised citizen. The two children of Leo's first wife, Emilie, were baptised aged 3 and 1 on 10 December 1833 at Mosley Street Unitarian church Manchester. They were to marry, respectively, the eldest daughter of an Earl (Orkney) and a baronet.

Educated at Eton College, and generous in character, the homosexual Schuster had a wide friendship circle. In 1924, knowing that Siegfried Sassoon was suffering from depression, Schuster made him the gift of his first car. He also allowed Sassoon to stay at his popular country retreat, "The Hut", opposite Monkey Island at Bray-on-Thames, but the two were never lovers.

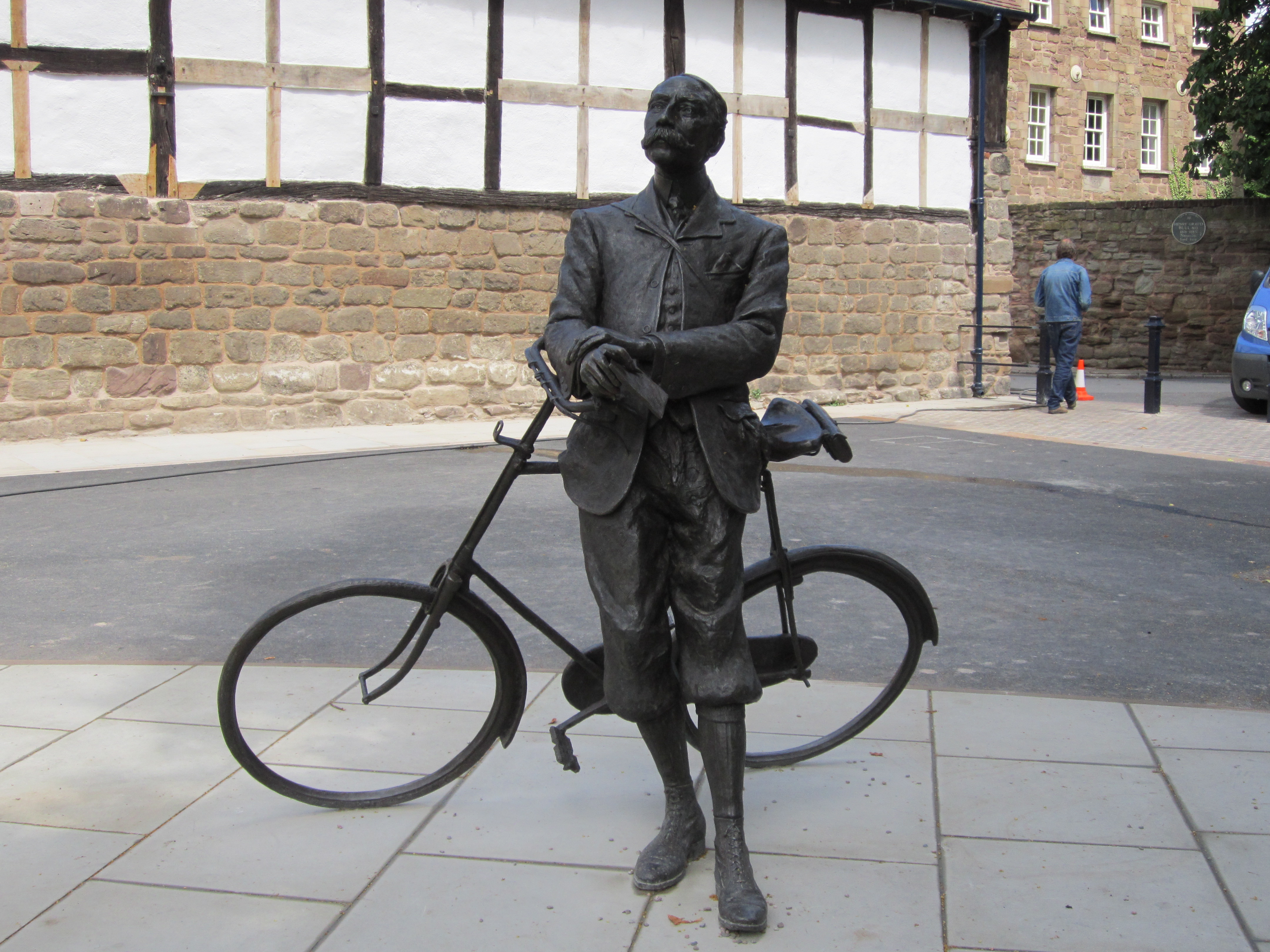
Edward Elgar statue, Hereford

Schuster was a close friend and travelling companion of composer Edward Elgar, and helped foster Elgar's popularity in the years leading up to World War I. It was at "The Hut" that Elgar partially wrote his First Symphony, Violin Concerto and the symphonic study Falstaff. Elgar dedicated his concert-overture "In the South (Alassio)", completed in 1904, to Schuster. Schuster was highly involved in organising the three-day Elgar Festival at Covent Garden in 1904, which was an unprecedented tribute to a living composer. Adrian Boult and Elgar first met at Schuster's house in 1905.

He was also a patron of Gabriel Fauré, and was responsible for introducing Fauré and Elgar to each other.

One of the stories retold by The Spectator when it moved into 22 Queen Street in 2007:

Boult liked to tell of how Schuster's sense of humour landed him in trouble with the ballad-singer Kennerley Rumford, with whom he had been at school. Joining in the craze for bicycling — embraced by both Elgar and Mahler — they went out for a ride, and Rumford said he had decided to give his bicycle a name. 'I shall call it Santley (a famous baritone) because it is a Singer.' Schuster retorted, 'I will call mine Clara Butt because it isn't.' He was aware the joke fell flat and realised why a few weeks later when he read the announcement of the engagement between Rumford and Miss Butt."

He died at Hove Lawn, Cromwell Road, Hove, on 26 December 1927 following an operation. In their obituary section The Times a few days later published two lengthy letters written by friends. He ensured Elgar's old age would be provided for by leaving him £7,000 in his will. Schuster left the bulk of his fortune to Leslie 'Anzie' Wylde, a handsome and good-natured New Zealand soldier whom he met in World War I, and made his chauffeur. When Wylde later married, Schuster extended extensions to his Thames-side house to accommodate the couple, and renamed it Long White Cloud (the Maori name for New Zealand). Sold after Wylde's death, it became the childhood home of Stirling Moss.
