= Burton's line =

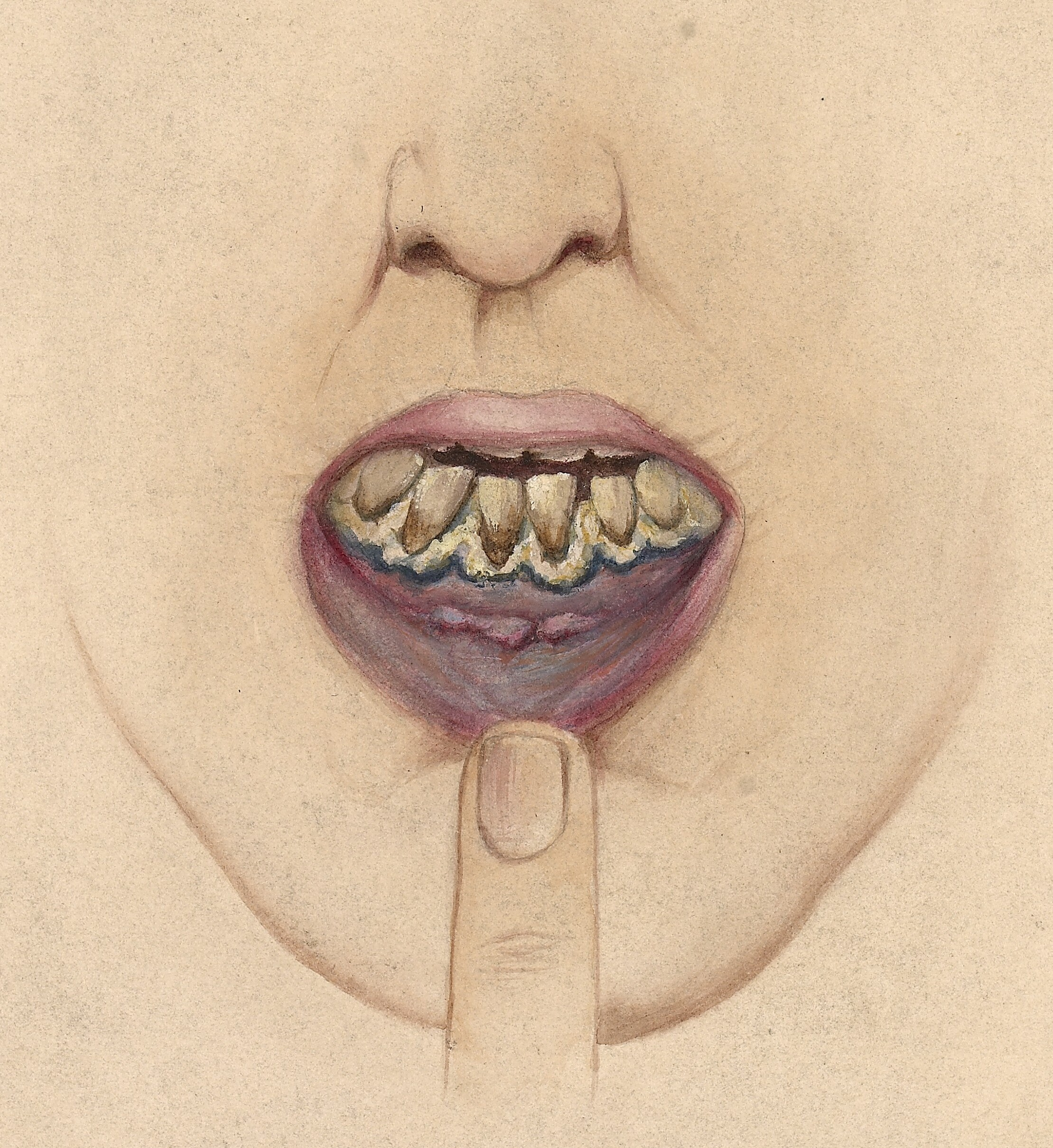
- Differential diagnosis: Chronic lead poisoning

Burton's line, also known as the Burton line or Burtonian line, is a clinical sign found in patients with chronic lead poisoning. It is a very thin, black-blue line visible along the margin of the gums, at the base of the teeth. It is caused by the reaction between circulating lead and sulphur ions produced by oral bacteria, forming deposits of lead sulfide in the gums.

The sign was described in 1840 by Henry Burton:

The edges of the gums attached to the necks of two or more teeth of either jaw, were distinctly bordered by a narrow leaden-blue line, about the one-twentieth part of an inch in width, whilst the substance of the gum apparently retained its ordinary colour and condition.

A similar line, the "bismuth line", occurs in people who have ingested bismuth compounds; bismuth, however, is of relatively low toxicity.
