= Haliburton, Nova Scotia =

Community in Nova Scotia, Canada

Coordinates: 45°40′49″N 62°44′42″W

Haliburton in Nova Scotia

Haliburton is a community in the Canadian province of Nova Scotia, located in Pictou County. The community is named after Thomas Chandler Haliburton.
