= Joseph Bonomi the Younger =

English sculptor, artist, Egyptologist and museum curator

Joseph Bonomi
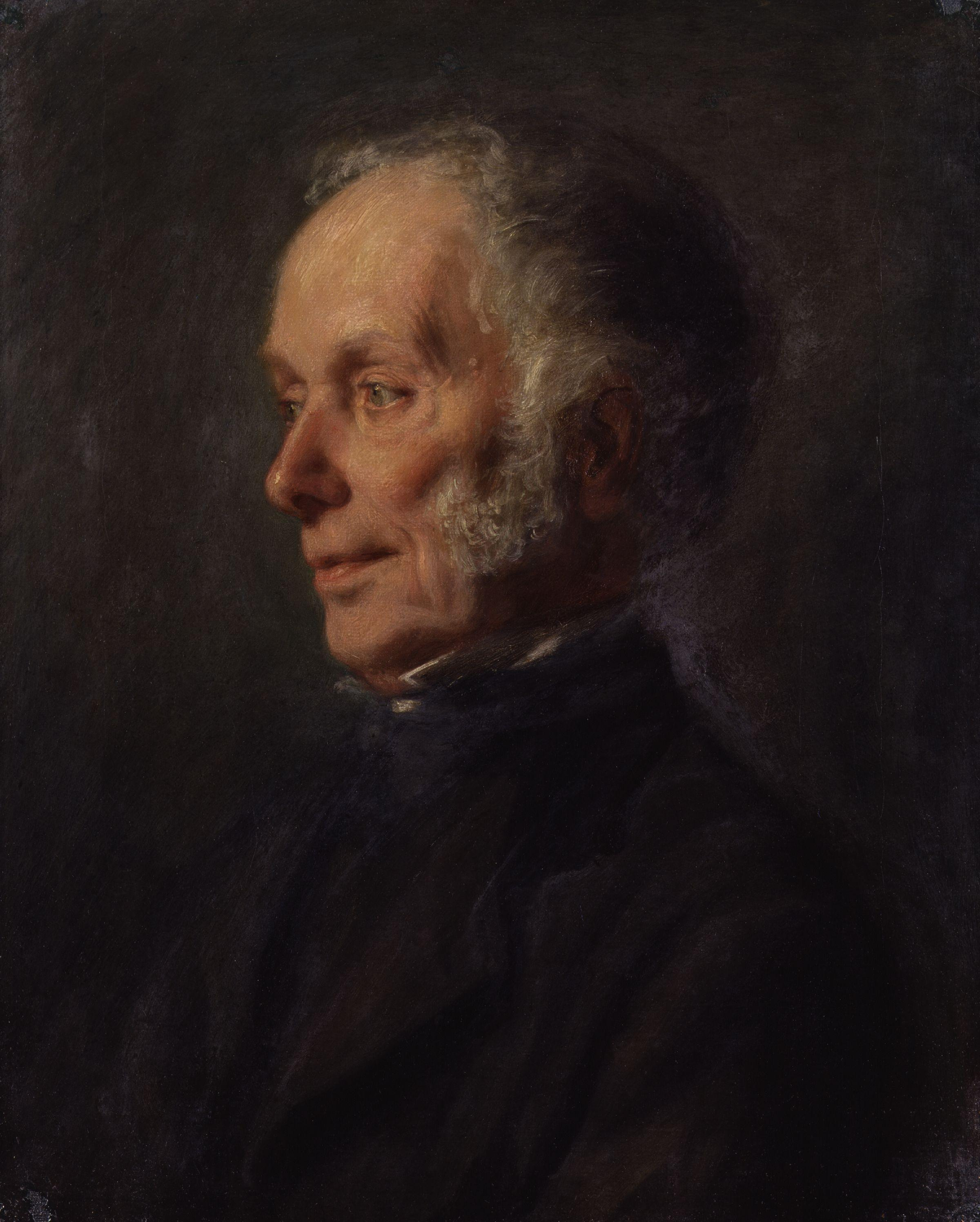
- Portrait of Joseph Bonomi the Younger by Matilda Sharpe, 1868
- Born: 9 October 1796; London, England
- Died: 3 March 1878 (aged 81)
- Education: Charles Bell

Joseph Bonomi the Younger (9 October 1796 – 3 March 1878) was an English sculptor, artist, Egyptologist and museum curator.

== Early life ==
Bonomi was born in London into a family of architects. His father, Joseph Bonomi the Elder, had worked with Robert and James Adam, while his older brother, Ignatius Bonomi, was a notable architect of the early and mid-19th century.

Bonomi studied under Charles Bell at the Royal Academy Schools from 1816 and won their Silver Medal in both 1817 and 1818, and was then the only pupil ever accepted by the sculptor Joseph Nollekens during 1818/19. Nollekens and Bonomi became close friends.

His first signed work (1819) also modestly describes himself as the pupil of Nollekens: this is the memorial in Calcutta Cathedral to Captain C L Showers killed with Lt Bagot and Lt Broughton at the action in Malown in 1815. Bonomi also signs the memorial to Lt Col John Weston in the Cathedral (d.1819). In 1823 he went to Rome, allegedly to study under Antonio Canova, but Canova died in October 1822 before Bonomi arrived. Nevertheless, Bonomi studied in Rome under other sculptors for several months.

In 1824 in Rome he produced "Dancing Bacchanal" which was much admired.

== The Hay Expedition ==
Bonomi took the opportunity to accompany Robert Hay on an expedition, via Malta, to Egypt in 1824. This began a lifelong interest in Egyptology.

From 1824 to 1826, he was a member of Hay's expedition where he sketched many antiquities. At Abu Simbel in 1825, Bonomi – responding to Hay's demands for great accuracy – devised a drawing frame (a viewfinder-type device equipped with a sight and a string or wire grid) to help them draw the temples' interior decorations. The expedition then moved on to Kalabsha, where Bonomi laboured to produce several plaster casts of the reliefs, to Philae and then to Thebes.

However, Bonomi's relationship with Hay was stormy. Bonomi was frustrated at what he regarded as a low salary; Hay resented Bonomi's wish to enhance his own reputation by producing drawings and casts for himself. In July 1826, Bonomi resigned (and was replaced as Hay's assistant by Edward William Lane).

In Cairo (1827–1828), Bonomi illustrated James Burton's Excerpta hieroglyphica. In July 1832, with his finances now more stable, he met Hay again, at Asyut, and was persuaded to rejoin his team (at a much higher salary) along with a French artist, Dupuy.

After Hay left Egypt in 1834, Bonomi undertook tours of Syria and Palestine (with Francis Arundale and Frederick Catherwood). In 1839 he prepared illustrations for Sir John Gardiner Wilkinson's Manners and Customs of the Ancient Egyptians.

== Architectural diversions ==
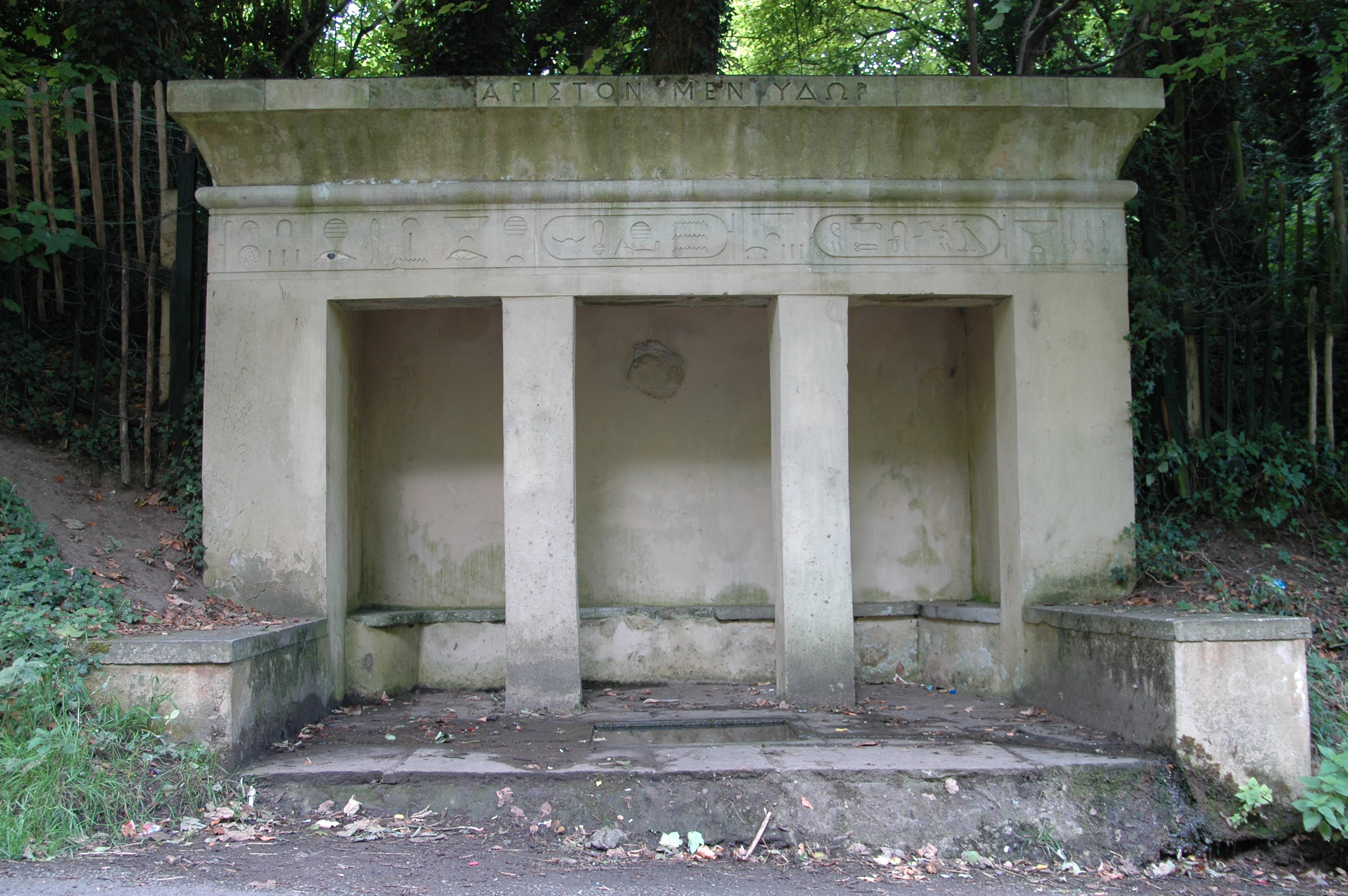
The Egyptian Spring at Hartwell.

No doubt influenced by his family's architectural associations, Bonomi designed the entrance to Abney Park Cemetery in Stoke Newington, London (in collaboration with William Hosking), built in Egyptian style with hieroglyphics signifying the Abode of the Mortal Part of Man. He also designed an Egyptian facade for John Marshall's Temple Works in Leeds (opened in 1841). The latter was undertaken shortly before Bonomi returned to Egypt as part of a Prussian expedition (1842–1844) led by Karl Richard Lepsius. An 'Egyptian Spring' in Hartwell, Buckinghamshire was designed by Bonomi in 1850 for Dr John Lee of Hartwell House.

== Work in England ==
On his return to England in 1844, Bonomi married Jessie Martin, daughter of artist John Martin (1789–1854).

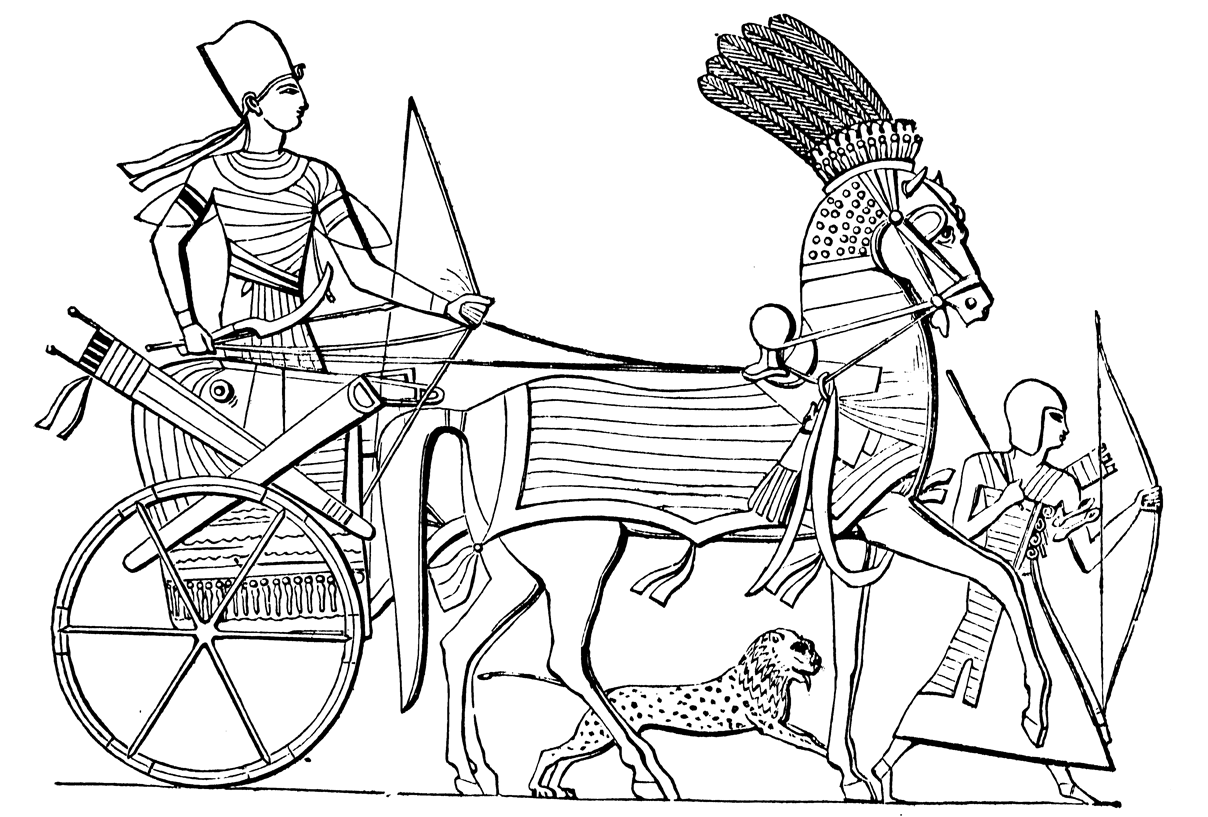
Egyptian Chariot, illustration by Joseph Bonomi from Nineveh and its Palaces.

Now based in London, Bonomi's work focussed upon his knowledge of Egypt and the Middle East and included cataloguing and illustrating many Egyptian collections (including that of Samuel Birch); he also set up with Owen Jones the Egyptian Court at The Crystal Palace, when it was rebuilt at Sydenham in 1854, and helped to arrange the Egyptian exhibits in the British Museum in London.

He published Nineveh and its Palaces and works on Egypt, Nubia, and Ethiopia, illustrated with his own drawings.

From 1861, Bonomi was Curator of the Sir John Soane's Museum in central London and retained this post until death.

With his brother Ignatius, he built a house, The Camels, at Wimbledon in south-west London. He also invented a machine for measuring the proportions of the human body, and wrote a treatise, The Proportion of the Human Figure published in 1856.

== Later life ==
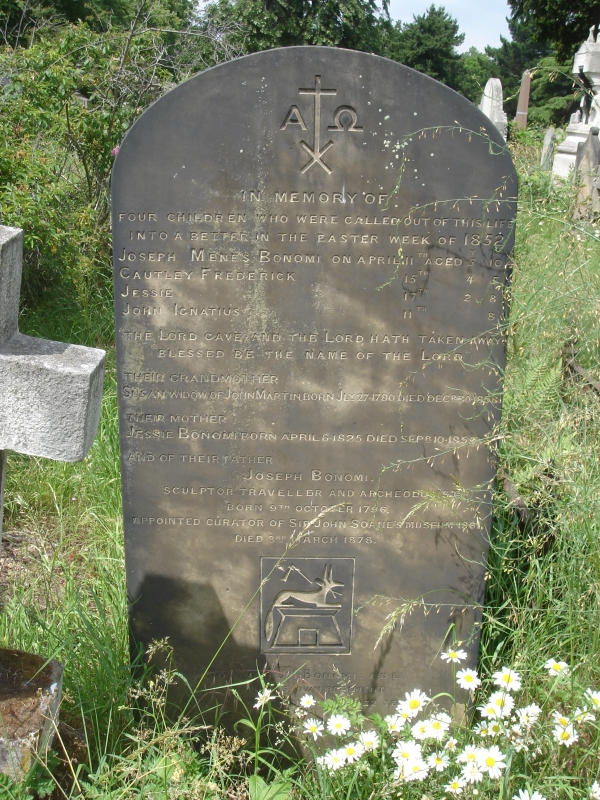
Funerary monument, Brompton Cemetery, London.

He died at The Camels in Wimbledon on 3 March 1878 and was buried in Brompton Cemetery.

== Family ==
He married Jessie Martin (6 April 1825 – 10 September 1859), daughter of the artist John Martin. They had twelve children, the first four of which died in April 1852 of whooping cough within a few weeks of each other.

The family grave in Brompton Cemetery (originally created for the infant deaths but later accommodating Bonomi and his wife) is abnormally plain for a sculptor of his skill.

== Sculptural works ==
Bonomi exhibited at the Royal Academy from 1820 to 1838.

- Jacob Wrestling with the Angel (1820)
- Bust of James Northcote (1821)
- Bust of Joseph Hume (1822) now held by New York Historical Society
- Bust of Henry Parks (1838)
- Bust of Prince Hoare (1822) displayed in The Crystal Palace
- Bust of Dr John Lee in Aylesbury Museum
