= Arthur Haliburton, 1st Baron Haliburton =

British civil servant

The Right Honourable The Lord Haliburton GCB DL JP
- Born: Arthur Lawrence Haliburton; 26 December 1832; Windsor, Nova Scotia Colony (present-day Canada)
- Died: 21 April 1907 (aged 74); Bournemouth, Hampshire, England
- Education: University of King's College, Nova Scotia
- Occupations: Civil servant, politician
- Parent(s): Thomas Chandler Haliburton; Louisa Neville
- Relatives: Robert Grant Haliburton (elder brother); William Hersey Otis Haliburton (grandfather); Leo Schuster (father-in-law)

Arthur Lawrence Haliburton, 1st Baron Haliburton GCB DL JP (26 December 1832 – 21 April 1907) was a Nova Scotia-born British civil servant. He was the first native Canadian to be raised to the Peerage of the United Kingdom.

== Early life ==
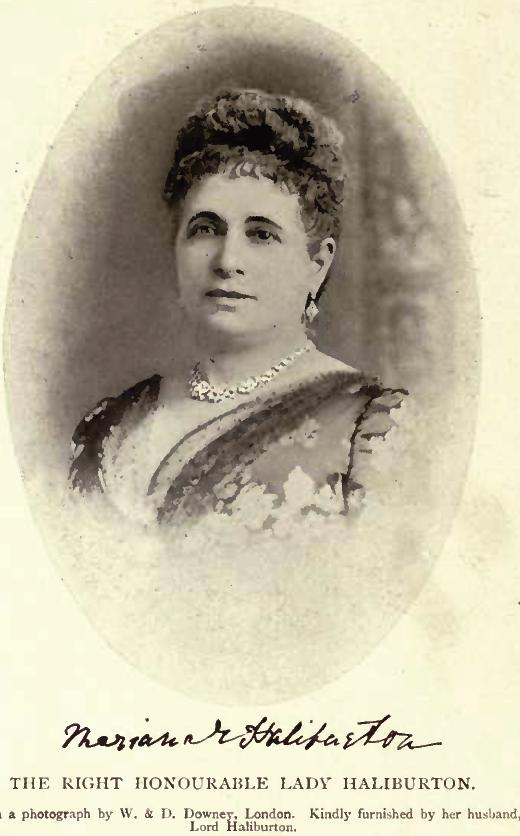
Mariana Emily, Lady Haliburton, by W. & D. Downey

Arthur Haliburton was born in Windsor, Nova Scotia, on 26 December 1832. He was a son of the Canadian author and British MP Thomas Chandler Haliburton, by Louisa Neville, who was the daughter of Captain Laurence Neville. His elder brother was the Canada First founder Robert Grant Haliburton.

Arthur Haliburton graduated from the University of King's College, Nova Scotia, with a Doctor of Civil Law (DCL). He was called to the bar, in Nova Scotia, in 1855, but was commissioned into the British Army as a civil commissary, as which he served in Turkey during the Crimean War, and in Canada, and in London, before his appointment, in 1869, as Assistant Director of Supplies and Transports, at which he resigned his commission and formally entered the Civil Service.

== Civil Service career ==
Haliburton was Director of Supplies and Transport at the War Office from 1878 to 1888; and Assistant Under-Secretary of State for War from 1888 to 1895; and Under-Secretary at the War Office from 1895 to 1897.

He was appointed a Companion of the Order of the Bath (CB) in 1880, a Knight Commander of the Order of the Bath (KCB) in 1885. He was made a Deputy Lieutenant of the County of London in 1893, and as a Justice of the Peace. He was invested as a Knight Grand Cross of the Order of the Bath (GCB) in 1897. On 21 April 1898, Haliburton was raised to the peerage as Baron Haliburton, of Windsor, in the Province of Nova Scotia and Dominion of Canada. Haliburton was the first native Canadian to be raised to the Peerage of the United Kingdom.

== Personal life ==
Lord Haliburton married Mariana Emily, who was the daughter of the merchant banker Leo Schuster, on 3 November 1877, but they had no children. His wife had been married to Sir William Clay, 2nd Baronet since 1855 until Clay's death in 1876. Haliburton and his wife lived at 57 Lowndes Square, London, England.

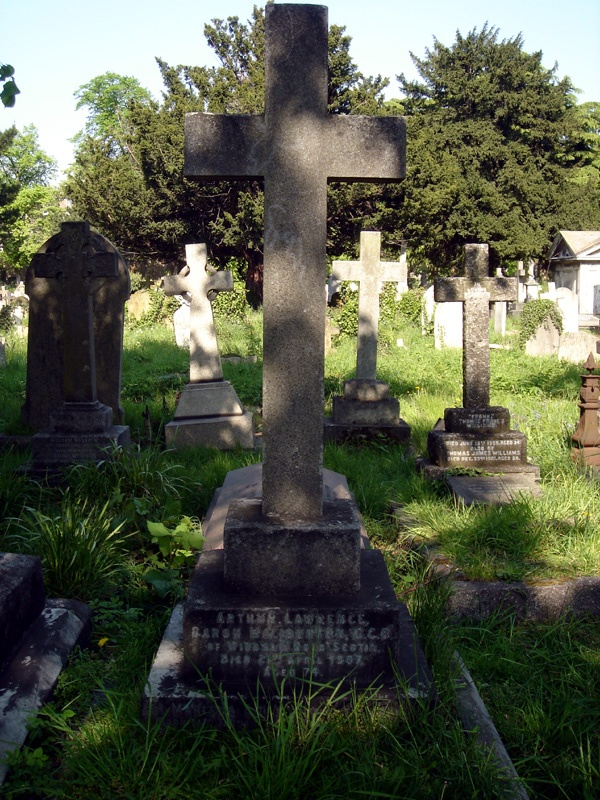
Haliburton's funerary monument in Brompton Cemetery, London

Haliburton died on 21 April 1907 at Branksome Towers Hotel, Bournemouth, Hampshire. He is buried in Brompton Cemetery, London. The barony became extinct on his death.

== Sources ==
J. B. Atlay (Rev. M. G. M. Jones). "Entry for Haliburton, Arthur Lawrence, Baron Haliburton (1832–1907)". Oxford Dictionary of National Biography (online ed.). Oxford University Press. doi:10.1093/ref:odnb/33646. (Subscription, Wikipedia Library access or UK public library membership required.)

Peerage of the United Kingdom
New creation	Baron Haliburton; 1898–1907	Extinct
