= John Wesley Weldon =

Canadian politician (c.1809–1885)

John Wesley Weldon (ca 1809 – 1885) was a lawyer, judge and political figure in the Province of New Brunswick, Canada. He represented Kent County in the Legislative Assembly of New Brunswick from 1828.

He married Frances Chandler, the daughter of judge Joshua Upham. Weldon practiced law in Richibucto, New Brunswick. He served as speaker for the legislative assembly from 1843 to 1850. In 1848, he married Susanna Lucy Anne Haliburton, the daughter of Thomas Chandler Haliburton, after the death of his first wife. They later moved to Saint John. In 1865, he was named judge in the Supreme Court of New Brunswick and moved to Fredericton.

Weldford Parish, New Brunswick formed in 1835, is partly named in honour of the Weldon family. The place named Weldford is a combination of the surnames Weldon and Ford. It was named for Supreme Court Judge, John Wesley Weldon who was the first Member of the Provincial Legislature for the County of Kent after separation from Northumberland County in 1826. He was sole member for quite some time until a second representative was added. This man was J.P. Ford of Halifax, Nova Scotia and he constructed the Ford Mill near the mouth of the Coal Branch River in the year 1828.

His son Charles Wesley later served in the Canadian House of Commons.
