= William Alexander Foster =

Canadian barrister and essayist

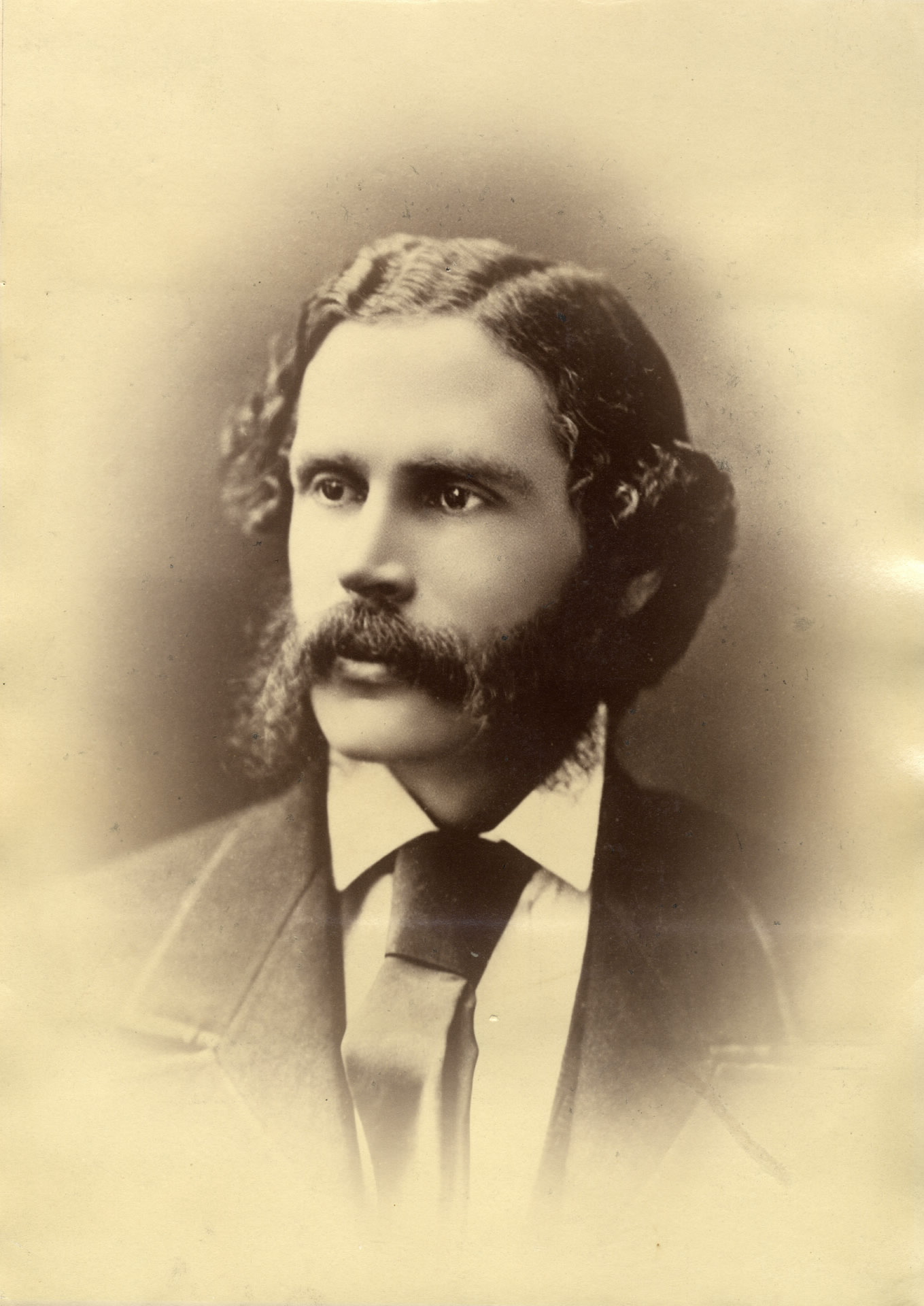
- Foster in the 1880s
- Born: 16 July 1840; Toronto, Upper Canada
- Died: 1 November 1888 (aged 48); Toronto, Ontario, Canada
- Occupations: Barrister; Essayist

William Alexander Foster, QC (16 July 1840 – 1 November 1888), was a Canadian barrister and essayist, best remembered as a co-founder of the Canada First movement and for his contributions to liberal nationalism in Canada.

== Life and career ==
William Alexander Foster was born in Toronto in Upper Canada on 16 July 1840 to James and Mary (née Morrison) Foster, who had emigrated to Canada from Ireland. Foster's father worked as a hardware merchant on Toronto's King Street.

Foster received his education at the Toronto Academy and earned a Bachelor of Laws at the University of Toronto in 1860, after which he articled with Adam Wilson and was called to the bar in 1861. He was a member of several legal partnerships, such as Harrison, Osler and Moss, and served on the University of Toronto senate.

As a writer Foster contributed to Canadian periodicals such as the Daily Telegraph, the Canadian Monthly and National Review, The Grumbler, and wrote scathing editorials in J. W. Bengough's humorous Grip, where his stance against Oliver Mowat's Ontario Liberal Party provided a balance to Bengough's position. Foster also contributed to British publications such as The Times and the Westminster Review. In 1867 he co-founded and edited the Monetary Times.

Foster wrote extensively on the conditions of the British North America that he believed conducive to Canadian Confederation which he believed would produce a nation he believed would thrive despite the dissipation of the British Empire's influence in the face of the growth of power of the United States. He co-organized the Canada First movement in Ottawa in 1868. the movement promoted ideals of plurality, Canadian national self-interest, political purity, and equality within the British Empire. The group idolized the conceptions of Canadian Confederation espoused by Thomas D'Arcy McGee, a Father of Confederation. The group opposed Louis Riel and the Métis resistance to joining Confederation that resulted in the Red River Rebellion in 1869–70; Foster may have authored the editorials in the Daily Telegraph that announced the execution of Thomas Scott by Riel's government and incited calls for retribution against the "dirty, ignorant, miserable half-breeds [the Métis]".

When the Treaty of Washington of 1871 threatened Canada's interests Foster responded with a pamphlet titled Canada First; or, our new nationality in which he argued for equality amongst the nations within the British Empire. To this end he called for Canadians to demonstrate patriotism for their new country to replace the old colonial mentality. He believed that the geographical and political commonalities of Canadians would result over time in a consciousness of Canadians as "northmen of the New World" despite the ethnic and linguistic diversity of the nation. The volume inaugurated a series of such nationalist books that continued with Nicholas Flood Davin's British Versus American Civilization in 1873.

As the Pacific Scandal unravelled, the Canada First movement tried to promote a new party with nationalist ideals called. In December 1873 the group wanted to promote Goldwin Smith as the party's first candidate in the Toronto West riding, but he was in England and the group promoted Foster's law partner and successful Liberal candidate Thomas Moss instead. Thereafter Foster formally co-organized the party as the Canadian National Association whose 11-point manifesto Foster wrote and which had its own journal, The Nation. The party met for the first time on 6 January 1874 and promoted trade protectionism, the secret ballot, and other reforms.

The Canada First movement ceased in 1876 and Foster returned to his law practice. He married John George Bowes' daughter Margaret in 1877 and the couple had two children: daughter Margaret Ethel and son Harold William Alexander. Foster was appointed to the Queen's Counsel on 26 October 1885. He died in Toronto on 1 November 1888. Goldwin Smith eulogized him as "animating spirit" in the young nation.
