= Caroline, Lady Wilkinson =

Welsh artist, writer (1822–1881)

Caroline, Lady Wilkinson (born Caroline Catharine [or Catherine] Lucas; 1822–1881) was a Welsh botanist and the author of Weeds And Wild Flowers: Their Uses, Legends, And Literature (1858). She was born on 10 May 1822 in Llandebie, Carmarthenshire, Wales and died on 2 October 1881 in Llandovery, Carmarthenshire.

Caroline Lucas married egyptologist John Gardner Wilkinson. Her husband was knighted in 1839 and as the wife of a knight, she was entitled to the customary style of lady. She illustrated her husband's book, Desert Plants of Egypt.
