= Susanna Haliburton Weldon =

Canadian artist (1817–1899)

Susanna Lucy Anne Weldon (née Haliburton) (1817–1899) was a Canadian artist and ceramics collector.

She was the eldest child of the judge and author Thomas Chandler Haliburton. She married John Wesley Weldon in 1848. Their only child, a son who was named Haliburton, was born in 1849, and trained as a barrister, but died in 1873.

She and her father resided in England from 1837, where they were hosted and entertained in London by their cousins Decimus Burton and James Burton Junior the Egyptologist. Susanna was impressed by James Burton Junior: of whom she wrote, in 1839, "Mr James I admire very much. He is one of the most well-bred persons I saw &... decidedly the flower of the flock".

Her collection of English and Chinese ceramics is "probably the oldest formed in Canada" and is now owned by the University of King's College in Nova Scotia, at which a scholarship is named after her.
