= Apodoulou =

Archaeological site on Crete

Coordinates: 35.1609°N 24.7230°E

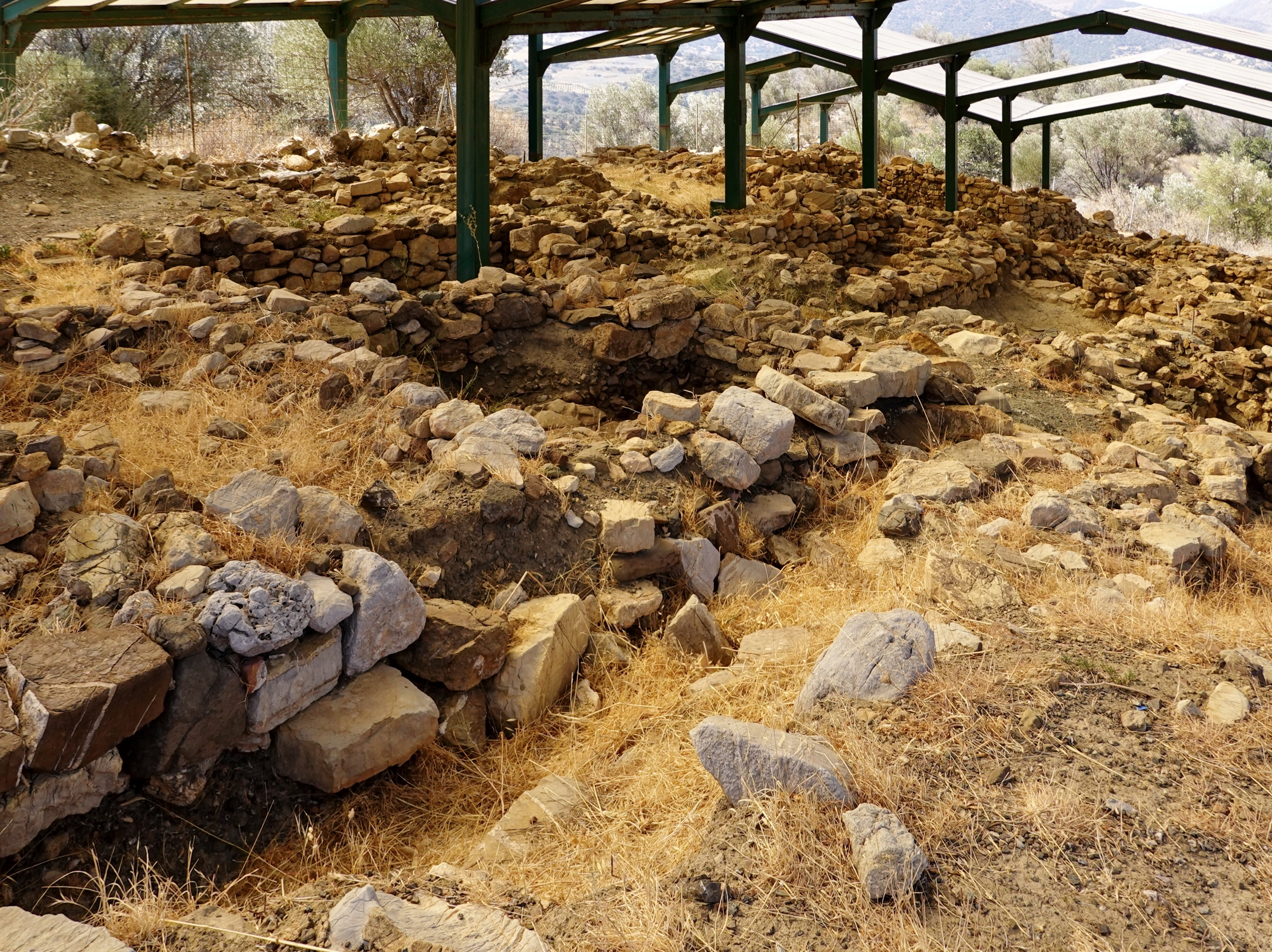
Apodoulou (Αποδούλου), municipality of Amari, Crete, Greece

Apodoulou (Greek: Αποδούλου) is the archaeological site of an ancient Minoan mansion or ceremonial building on Crete. It overlooks the Libyan Sea from an altitude of 450 metres (1,480 ft) above sea level.

== Archaeology ==
Apodoulou was first excavated by Spyridon Marinatos in 1934.

The area was inhabited from Late Neolithic times to the Late Minoan period, and the building was in use in the Middle Minoan III period. The site has yielded Linear A inscriptions on a basin and fragments of a stone cylindrical jar, as well as a small golden axe.

400 metres (440 yd) north of Apodoulou is a Late Minoan vaulted tomb. Four sarcophagi were found here and are on exhibit at the Archaeological Museum of Rethymno.
