= Robert Grant Haliburton =

Canadian lawyer and anthropologist

Robert Grant Haliburton QC DCL
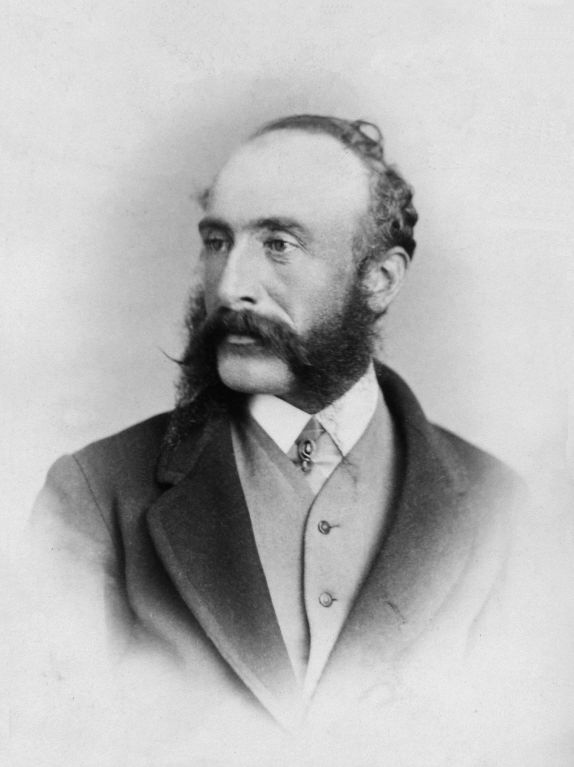
- Haliburton in 1868
- Born: 3 June 1831; Windsor, Nova Scotia, Canada
- Died: 6 March 1901 (aged 69); Pass Christian, Mississippi, US
- Education: University of King's College
- Occupations: Lawyer, Anthropologist
- Parent: Thomas Chandler Haliburton; Louisa Neville
- Relatives: William Hersey Otis Haliburton (grandfather); Arthur Haliburton, 1st Baron Haliburton (brother)

Robert Grant Haliburton Q.C. D.C.L. (3 June 1831 – 6 March 1901) was a Canadian lawyer and anthropologist who founded the Canada First organization that contended that English Canadians were the "heirs of Aryan northmen" and that French Canadians were a "bar to progress".

== Early life ==
Haliburton was born in Windsor, Nova Scotia. His father was the Canadian author and British MP Thomas Chandler Haliburton, who wrote the bestselling Clockmaker series about the humorous adventures of the character Sam Slick. His brother was Lord Haliburton, who was the first native Canadian to be raised to the Peerage of the United Kingdom.

Like his father he graduated from University of King's College and was part of the local volunteer militia in which he rose to the rank of lieutenant-colonel. He was called to the bar in 1853.

== Canada First and Racial Theories ==
The Canada First movement was founded in Ottawa in 1868, by Ontario residents George Denison, Charles Mair, William Alexander Foster, and Robert Grant Haliburton. It was supported by Goldwin Smith and Edward Blake. The founders contended that the milder southern climate induced "degeneration, decay, and effeminacy" in its inhabitants, whereas the harsher northern climate stimulated "the inclination to be moderate".

The Canada First movement contended that the French Canadians and Métis people impeded the development of civilisation in Canada by the English Canadians.

== Later life ==
Poor health provoked Haliburton to move to warmer climates including Jamaica, where, after his lucrative career in law, he was able to live off his investments and devote himself to his hobby of anthropology, in which he discovered the "dwarf races" of northern Africa and the Atlas region. He died in Pass Christian, Mississippi, United States, on 6 March 1901, at the age of 69 years.

== Works ==
- An Address On The Present Condition [of] British North America (1857)
- The Festival of the Dead (1867)
- The Coal Trade of the New Dominion (1867)
- Explorations in the Pictou Coal Field (1867)
- Men Of The North And Their Place In History (1869)
- Explorations in the Pictou Coal Field in 1867 and 1868 (1869)
- A Sketch Of The Life And Times Of Judge Haliburton (1897)
- Voices From The Street
