= Robert Hay (Egyptologist) =

Scottish traveller, antiquarian, and Egyptologist

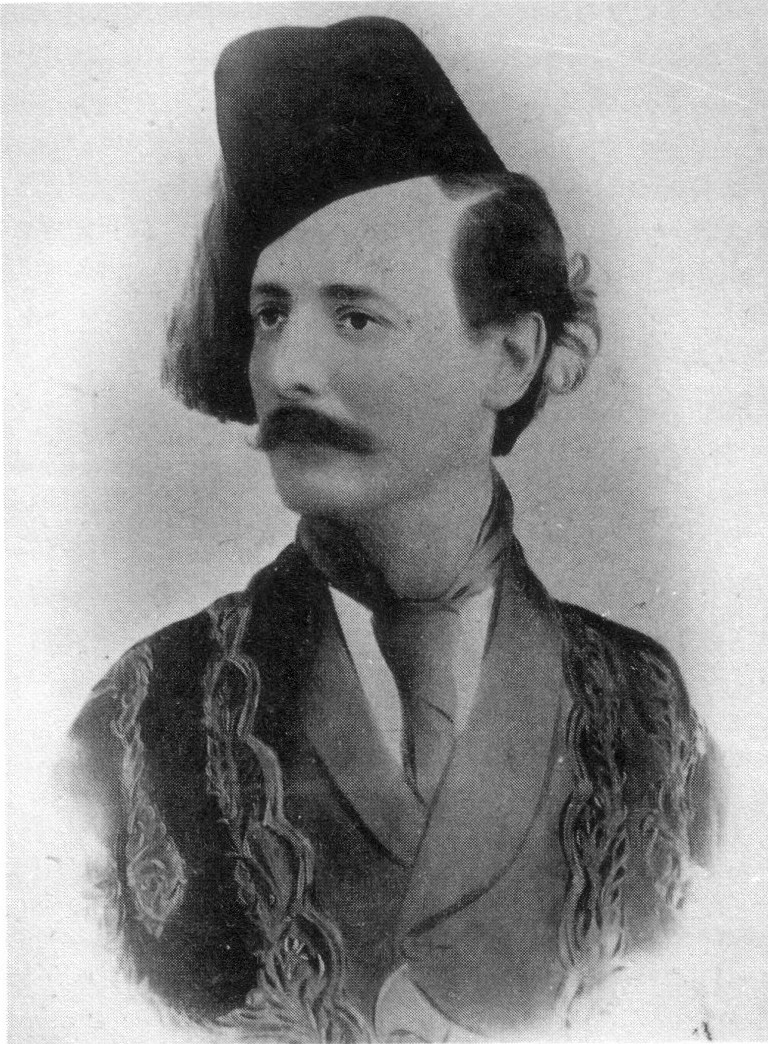
Robert Hay

Robert Hay (6 January 1799 – 4 November 1863) was a Scottish traveller, antiquarian, and early Egyptologist. He was born in Duns Castle, Berwickshire. During his service in the Royal Navy he visited Alexandria, Egypt, in 1818.

In 1824 he met Joseph Bonomi in Rome, whom he hired as an artist and who accompanied Hay to Egypt. They stayed in Egypt from November 1824 until 1828, and 1829 to 1834, recording monuments and inscriptions, and making a large number of architectural plans. His manuscripts are now primarily in the British Library, and many of his plaster casts in the British Museum.

In May 1828 Hay visited Malta, where he married Kalitza Psaraki, the daughter of the chief magistrate of Apodhulo, Crete; Hay had earlier rescued her from the slave market in Alexandria. After his death in East Lothian, Scotland, in 1863, Hay's collection of Egyptian antiquities was sold to the British Museum, though some objects were purchased by the Boston Museum of Fine Arts in 1872.
