= Sam Slick =

Fictional character created by Thomas Chandler Haliburton

Sam Slick is a character created in 1835 by Thomas Chandler Haliburton, a Nova Scotian judge and author. With his wry wit and Yankee voice, Sam Slick of Slicksville put forward his views on "human nature" in a regular column in the Novascotian. The twenty-one sketches were published in a collection entitled The Clockmaker or, also known as, the Sayings and Doings of Samuel Slick of Slicksville First Series in 1836 and supplemented by an additional 12 unpublished or new sketches. The book was Canada's first international bestseller and was hugely popular not only in Nova Scotia, but also in Britain and the United States.

Slick’s wise-cracking commentary on the colonial life of Nova Scotia and relations with the U.S. and Britain struck a note with readers, which led to a second series in 1838 and a third in 1840. The satirical sketches, mocking both Canadians and Americans, made Haliburton one of the most popular writers of comic fiction in English of that era. The Clockmaker, which was also translated into German, established Haliburton as one of the founders of North American humour. As Arthur Scobie notes in The Canadian Encyclopedia, The Clockmaker stories, "proved immensely popular and, ironically, have influenced American humour as much as Canadian."
