= John Gardner Wilkinson =

British egyptologist (1797–1875)

Sir Gardner Wilkinson
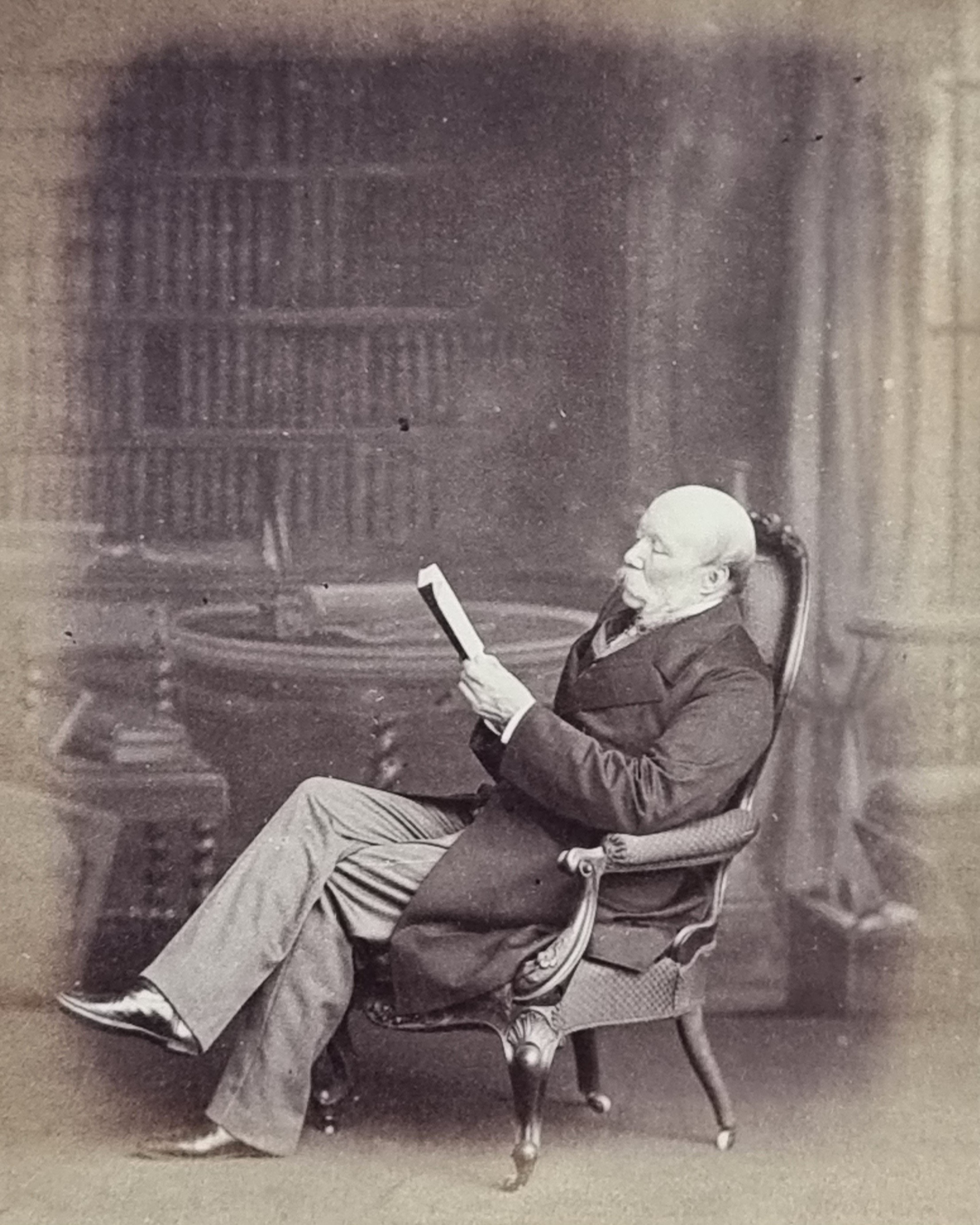
- Portrait of Gardner Wilkinson, pioneer Egyptologist, c. 1863
- Born: 5 October 1797; Little Missenden, Buckinghamshire, England
- Died: 29 October 1875 (aged 78); Llandovery, Carmarthenshire, Wales
- Known for: Egyptology
- Spouse: Caroline Lucas

Sir John Gardner Wilkinson (5 October 1797 – 29 October 1875) was an English traveller, writer and pioneer Egyptologist of the 19th century. He is often referred to as "the Father of British Egyptology".

== Childhood and education ==
Wilkinson was born in Little Missenden, Buckinghamshire. His father was a Westmoreland clergyman, the Reverend John Wilkinson, an amateur enthusiast for antiquities. Wilkinson inherited a modest income from his early-deceased parents. Sent by his guardian to Harrow School in 1813, he later went up to Exeter College, Oxford in 1816. Wilkinson ultimately took no degree and, suffering from ill-health, decided to travel to Italy. There in 1819 he met the antiquarian Sir William Gell and resolved to study Egyptology.

== First sojourn in Egypt ==
Wilkinson first arrived in Egypt in October 1821 as a young man of 24 years, remaining in the country for a further 12 years continuously. During his stay, Wilkinson visited virtually every known ancient Egyptian site, skillfully recording inscriptions and paintings as a talented copyist and compiling copious notes.

== Return to England and honours ==
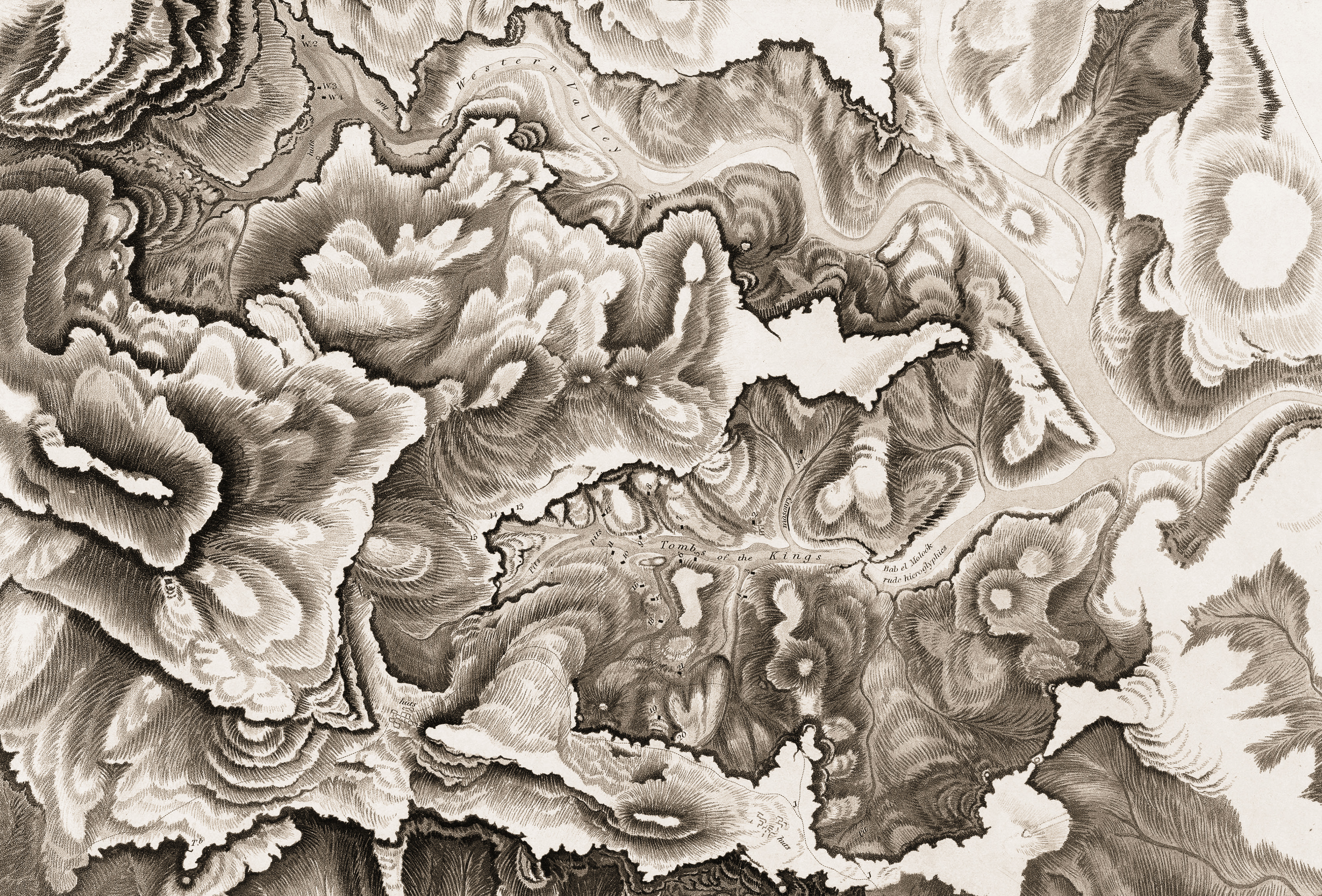
Wilkinson's numbering system for the tombs of the Valley of the Kings remains in use today

Finally returning to England for his health's sake in 1833, succeeding in being elected to the Royal Society in 1834, Wilkinson went on to publish his researches in a large number of publications. Although preceded by The Topography of Thebes and General View of Egypt in 1835, Wilkinson's most significant work was Manners and Customs of the Ancient Egyptians. First published in three volumes in 1837 and subsequently illustrated by Joseph Bonomi, this title stood as the best general treatment of ancient Egyptian culture and history for the next half century. Acclaim for this publication brought Wilkinson a knighthood in 1839 and ensured him the title of the first distinguished British Egyptologist.

== Further travels and research ==
The now Sir John Gardner Wilkinson returned to Egypt in 1842, contributing an article entitled "Survey of the Valley of the Natron Lakes" to the Journal of the Geographical Society in 1843. The same year witnessed his publication of a revised and enlarged edition of his Topography, entitled Moslem Egypt and Thebes.

Wilkinson travelled in Dalmatia, Montenegro, Bosnia and Herzegovina during 1844, an account of his observations being published in 1848 (Dalmatia and Montenegro, 2 volumes).

A third visit to Egypt in 1848 to 1849 was followed by a final visit to Thebes in 1855. Thereafter, Wilkinson remained in England where he investigated Cornish antiquities and studied zoology.

== Marriage, death and legacy ==
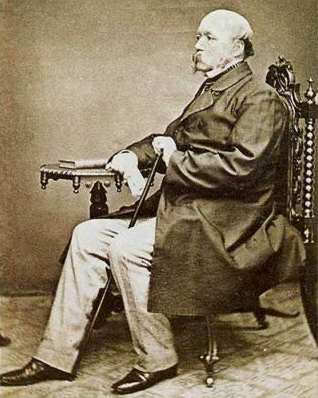
John Gardner Wilkinson, Egyptologist

In 1856, at the age of 59, he married Caroline Catherine Lucas (b. 1822), the daughter of Henry Lucas of Glamorganshire. Lady Wilkinson worked on editing her husband's manuscripts as well as writing several books of her own, the most successful of which was Weeds and Wildflowers (1858).

Wilkinson died at Llandovery in 1875. He had bequeathed his collections with an elaborate catalogue in 1864 to his cousin, Lady Georgiana Stanhope Lovell, who had married Sir John Harper Crewe at Calke Abbey (now owned by the National Trust). He left his widow in poor financial straits from which she was rescued by a pension that Benjamin Disraeli persuaded the Queen to grant her.

Wilkinson's papers are now held in the Bodleian Library, Oxford, and form an invaluable resource to some of the earliest recorded states (dating to 1821 to 1856, before the advent of widespread tourism and collection) of many Egyptian monuments. His library and two plan folders are held in the National Trust collection at Calke Abbey. Many historic sites were subsequently damaged or lost altogether, making Wilkinson's work all the more important.

== Publications ==
- Materia Hieroglyphica (1828)
- The Topography of Thebes and General View of Egypt, London, 1835
- Dalmatia and Montenegro, London, 1848
- Manners and Customs of the Ancient Egyptians, including their private life, government, laws, arts, manufactures, religion, agriculture, and early history, derived from a comparison of the paintings, sculptures, and monuments still existing, with the accounts of ancient authors, (6 volumes, 1837–41). New edition, revised & corrected, 1878
- "Modern Egypt and Thebes: being a description of Egypt; including the information required for travellers in that country." (1843) Full text available on google books.
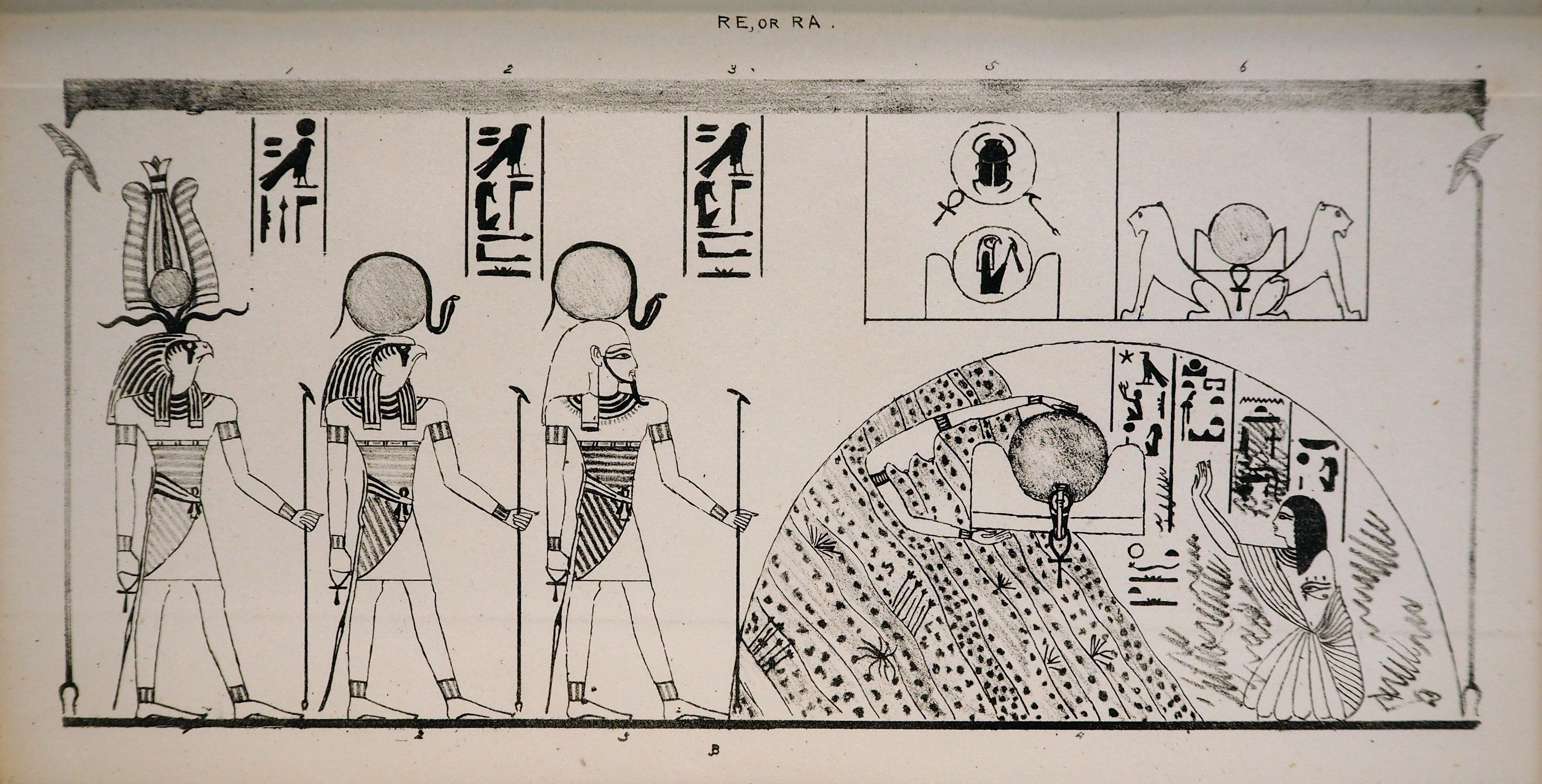
Plate 29: 'Ra or Re', 1841

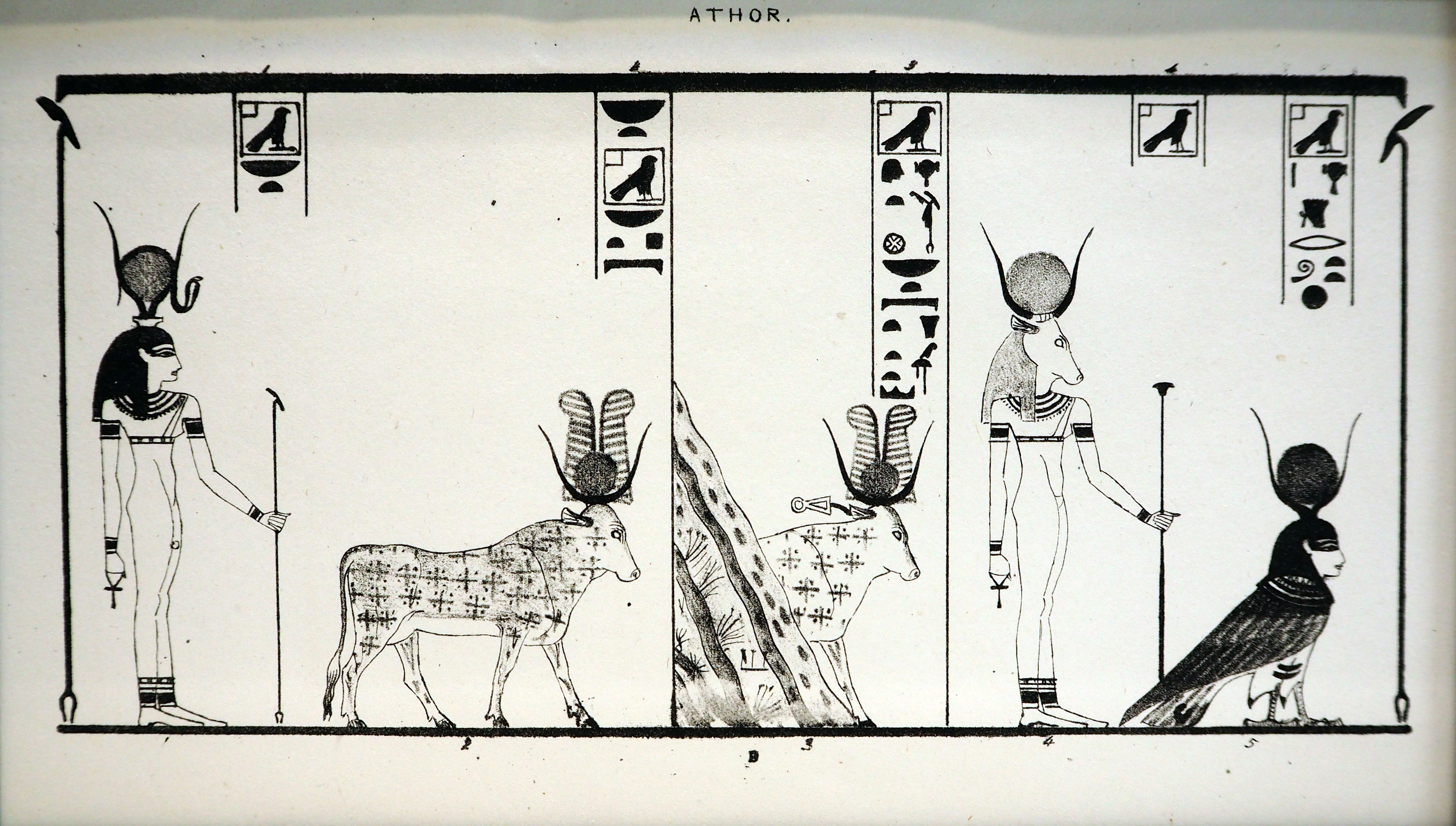
Plate 36: 'Athor', 1841

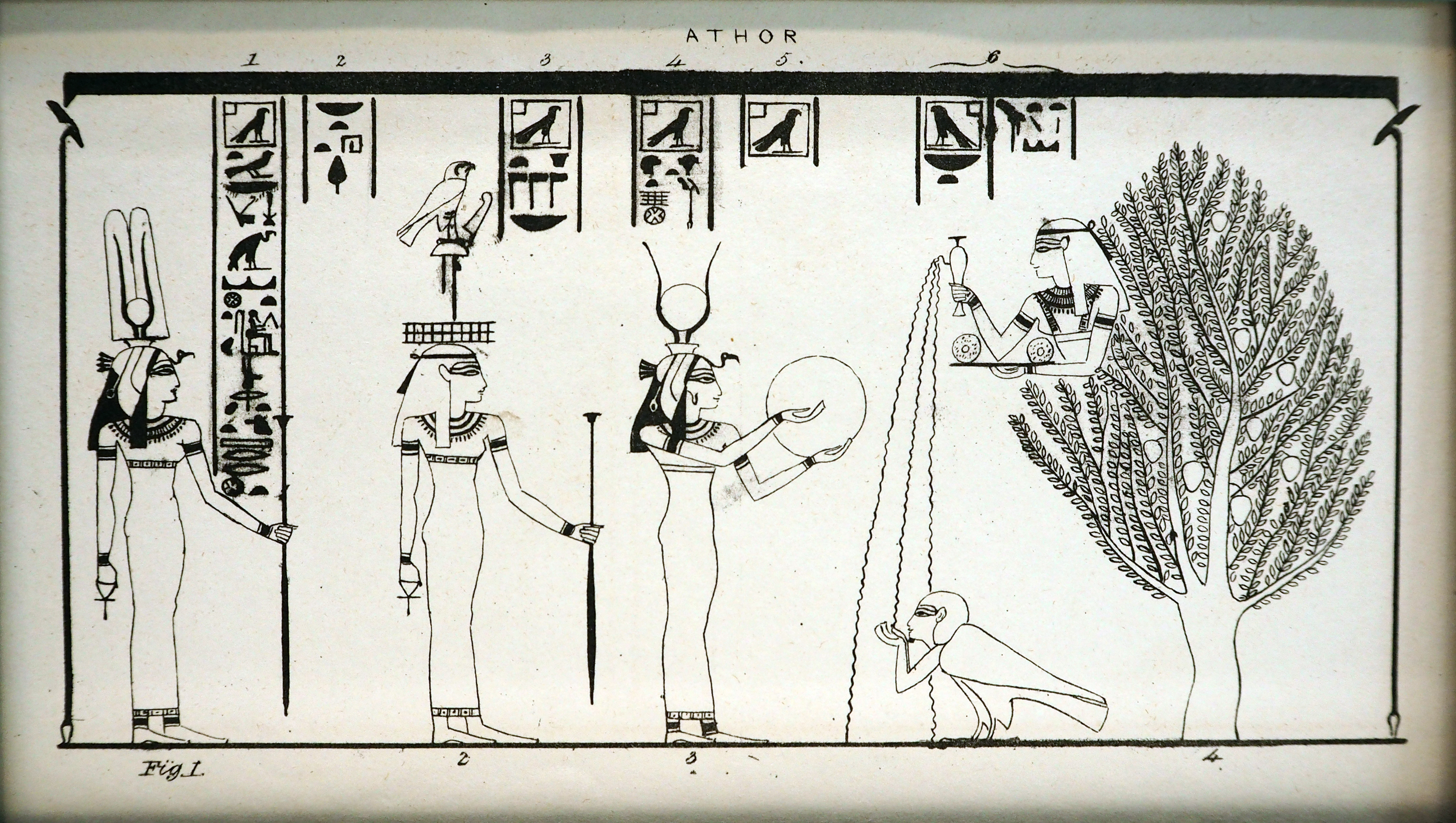
Plate 36A: 'Athor in the Persea-Tree', 1841
