= W. & D. Downey =

Victorian era studio photographers in London

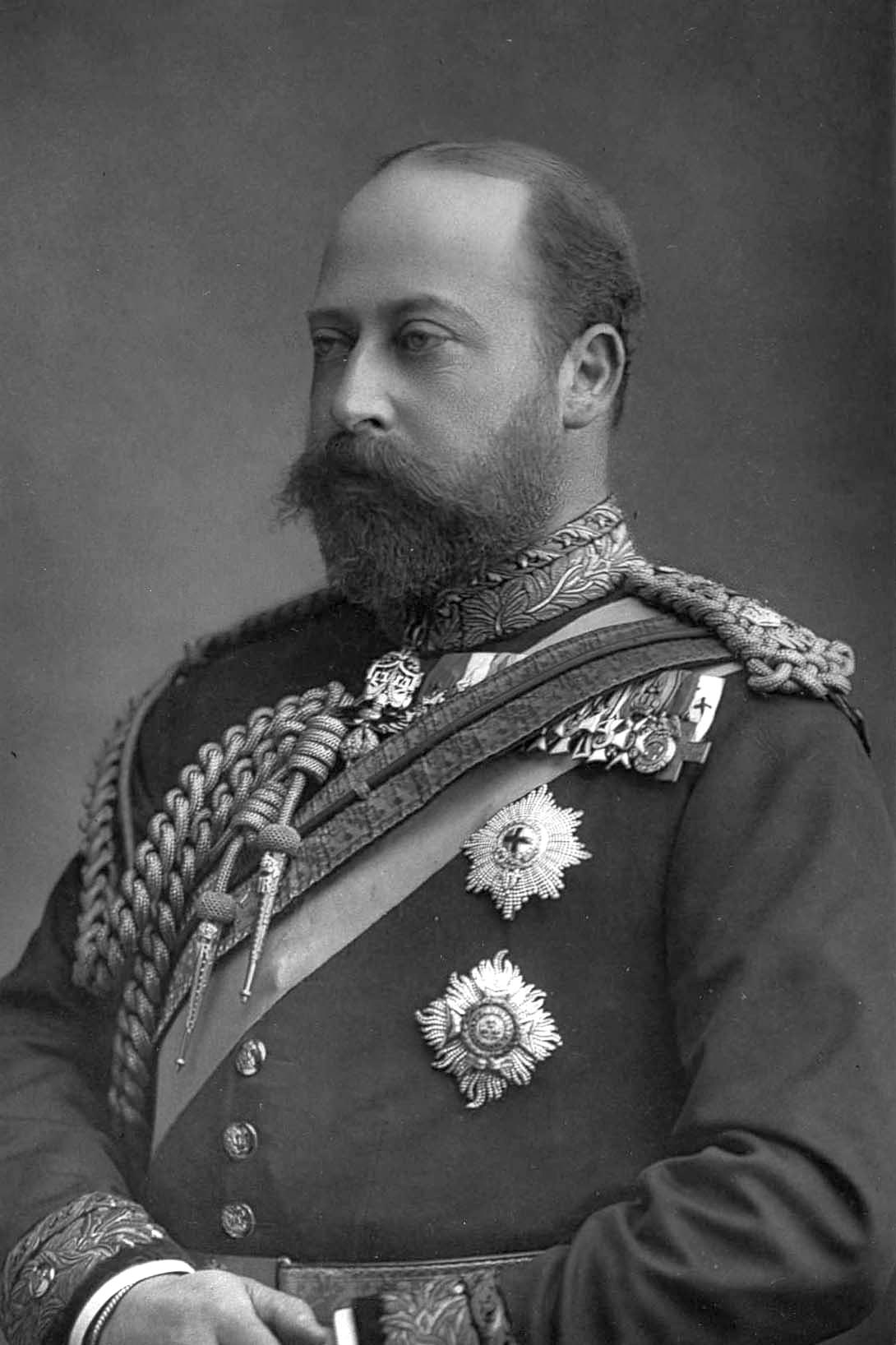
A photo of Edward VII, in the 1880s, as Prince of Wales by W. & D. Downey

W. & D. Downey were Victorian studio photographers operating in London from the 1860s to the 1910s.

== History ==
William Downey (14 July 1829 in South Shields — 7 July 1915 in Kensington), who came to be known as the Queen's Photographer, was born in King Street in South Shields, a decade before commercial photography was practiced.

William initially worked as a carpenter and boatbuilder, but in about 1855 he set up a photography studio in South Shields with his brother Daniel Downey (1831 – 15 July 1881). They later established branches in Blyth, Morpeth and Newcastle. Their first Royal commission was to provide photographs for Queen Victoria of the Hartley Colliery Disaster in January 1862.

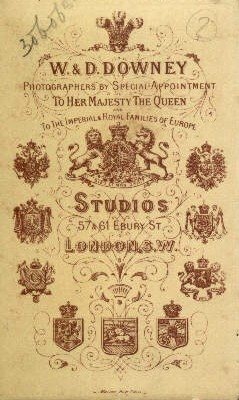
An advertisement of W. & D. Downey, displaying numerous Royal Warrants, from both Asian and European royalty.

In 1863 they opened a studio at 9, Eldon Square in Newcastle. (The building was demolished in 1973.) The same year William set up a studio in the Houses of Parliament and produced portraits of every parliamentarian of the day. The location of the resulting images has been lost.

William moved to 57 & 61 Ebury Street in London in 1872 and opened another studio, his brother managing the Newcastle branch. The London studio enjoyed the patronage of Queen Victoria and the Prince of Wales; the brothers took photos at Balmoral and Frogmore during the 1860s. The studio's first Royal image was of the Princess of Wales at the York Agricultural Show in 1865. The studio also produced the iconic carte-de-visite portrait of the Princess of Wales piggybacking Princess Louise. The studio received a Royal Warrant in 1879.

Downey used Joseph Swan's carbon process for their best work. In the 1880s Mawson, Swan & Morgan of Newcastle, was the world's largest manufacturer of photographic dry plates, the convenience of which made photography a commercial reality. George Eastman spent some time there during the eighties and afterwards invented the Box Brownie and roll film, ending the monopoly of studios on permanent images.

William Downey's son, William Edward Downey (1855–1908), managed most of the royal sittings for the London studio during the Edwardian era. Gladys Cooper, a child photographic model of the time, reminisces about the Downeys in her autobiography:

I can remember the Downeys quite well – they were father and son. "Old" Downey was a very tall old man with a long white beard, and very red-rimmed eyes. He always wore a long frock-coat with a red ribbon in his buttonhole, and looked a dignified old gentleman, who was quite capable of receiving and greeting Royals with just the right manner of respectful homage. It was considered a great honour to be photographed by "Old" Downey himself. He never "took" anyone lower than one of the Princesses, or perhaps a duchess now and then, if he felt in the mood. His staff treated him rather like Royalty itself, and, when he rode abroad in his carriage, they would stand round with rugs, cushions, etc., until he waved them aside in lordly fashion.

"Young" Downey (he was always known as "Young" Downey to distinguish him from his father) was a big man – or so he seemed to me then – with a bald head. He was an artist in his work, and used to say that he always knew the best side of anybody's face after one good look at them. He certainly made some fine photographs of the famous beauties of his time, and possessed the art of retaining character in the face of his sitter...

I used to enjoy my visits to the Downey père et fils. "Young" Downey was very fond of children, and my sisters Doris and Grace and I had plenty of fun playing about in the great studio, or dressing ourselves up in the wonderful assortment of garments that he kept there.

== Marriages and families ==
William Fowler Downey (the senior William) had married Caroline Griffiths of Cheshire. They had two sons, William Edward and Robert Ingham (who died an infant). Caroline died in 1874.

William remarried, to Lucy Lyon in 1877; she was born in 1843 in Speenhamland, Berkshire. Their children were Arthur James Hope and Laura Evelyn Downey.

William's youngest son, Arthur, as A.J.H. Downey, continued the family business: his work included a portrait of King George V's children in 1910, the year of the king's accession.

William's brother Daniel also married, to Elizabeth Smith Beloe on 10 March 1863. She was the eldest daughter of William Linton Beloe, a Professor of Music. They had three children together: Robert Ingham Downey, Elizabeth, and Victoria Christine. The mother Elizabeth died, aged 40, on 22 September 1873.

On 28 December 1876 Daniel remarried. His second wife was Mary née Stratford. Daniel died on 15 July 1881 in Bethnal House (a private lunatic asylum) in Bethnal Green, London. His widow Mary Downey survived to 1948.

== Bibliography ==
- The Cabinet Portrait Gallery, London: Cassell & Co., 1890–94 5 vols., 4to, with 180 mounted photographs by W. & D. Downey
- A grand old photographer, series of 10 weekly articles in Pall Mall Budget 1 January – 19 March 1891, illus
- Our Royal photographs – How they were taken, Pall Mall Budget 26 July 1894 p 13, photo, interview with William Downey
- Mr William Downey, the grand old man of photography, Evening News 12 October 1895 p 1, port;
- Mr W. Downey, the Queen's photographer, English Illustrated Magazine March 1896 pp 643 – 652, illus
- W. E. L Animated photographs at Windsor Castle 23 November 1896, Lady's Pictorial 5 December 1896, special supplement showing Queen Victoria with her guests including the Tsar and Tsarina of Russia.
- The doyen of photographers – Mr Wm Downey of Messrs W & D Downey, Ebury Street, S W, Professional Photographer Vol 1 1906 pp 10 – 14, illus
- Forty years a Royal photographer, British Journal of Photography, 29 November 1907 pp 902 – 903, illus
- Obituary, British Journal of Photography 16 July 1915
