= Canada First =

19th-century Canadian nationalists

The Canada First movement is a Canadian nationalist movement organized in 1868 that promoted the British Protestant component as central to Canadian identity. It was at first supported by Goldwin Smith and Edward Blake. Ontario residents George Denison, Charles Mair, William Alexander Foster and Robert Grant Haliburton founded the movement.

John Christian Schultz, Canadian Party founder, became a leading member of the Canadian Party and was a chief opponent of Louis Riel. The execution of Thomas Scott during the 1870 Red River Rebellion was a major catalyst in the formation of the Canada First movement. Caught in the middle of the rebellion, Schultz and Mair narrowly escaped execution themselves. Upon their return to Ontario the two men were featured prominently in a massive Toronto protest organized by the Canada Firsters. Tapping into Orange Protestant outrage over the killing of Scott the movement's leaders stressed the theme of national betrayal at the hands of the Red River rebels and Louis Riel.

On the occasion of an 1874 by-election in the Federal district of West Toronto, the Canada First movement became an official political party known as the Canadian National Association. Although the party failed to nominate a candidate, they released a party-platform that called for the "British Connection, Consolidation of the Empire and in the meantime a voice in treaties affecting Canada." Wanting a greater voice and autonomy for Canada in conducting its own foreign policy the movement heralded the Imperial Federation movement.

Although the party counted among its early supporters former Ontario Premier and prominent Liberal Edward Blake, Blake's decision to accept a position in Alexander Mackenzie's government in 1875 led to the party's quick collapse. By 1876 their weekly newspaper organ The Nation, edited by Charles Lindsey, had closed.

In 2025, both Prime Minister Justin Trudeau and Opposition Leader Pierre Poilievre used the phrase to describe their policies of retaliatory tariffs against President Donald Trump's 2025 tariffs and comments of Canada being the "51st state".

== See also ==
- Canadian Party
- America First (policy)
- America First Committee
- America First Party (1943)
