= KV30 =

Ancient Egyptian tomb in the Valley of the Kings

- Burial site of Unknown
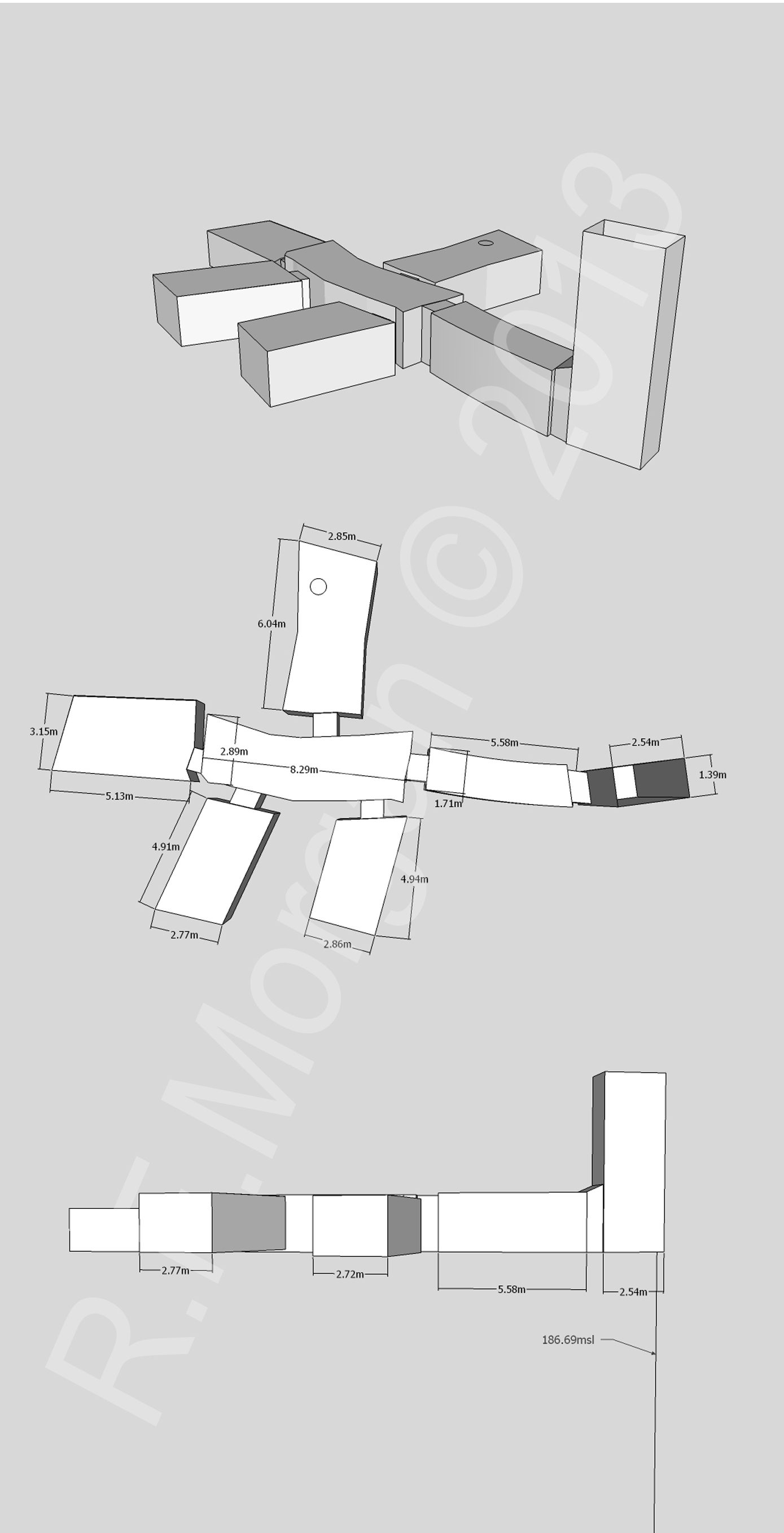
- Schematic of KV30

- Location within Egypt
- Coordinates: 25°44′19.6″N 32°36′01.0″E
- Location: East Valley of the Kings
- Discovered: 1817?
- Excavated by: Giovanni Belzoni? (1817); University of Basel (2009-10)
- Decoration: Undecorated
- Layout: Shaft and chamber(s)
- ← Previous; KV29 Next → KV31

Tomb KV30 is an ancient Egyptian tomb located in the Valley of the Kings in Egypt. It likely dates to the mid-Eighteenth Dynasty and was used for the burial of an unknown individual. It may have been discovered by Giovanni Belzoni in 1817, working on a commission from the 2nd Earl Belmore. It was excavated between 2009 and 2010 by the University of Basel's Kings' Valley Project.

== Location and architecture ==
KV30 is located in a side valley that leads to the tomb of Thutmose III (KV34) and other tombs of similar date including the tomb of Thutmose IV's mother Tiaa (KV32) and KV42. It is approximately opposite KV26.

The layout consists of a vertical shaft 7 metres (23 ft) deep which opens onto a corridor that leads to one large chamber surrounded by four smaller rooms. It has a total length of 23 metres (75 ft).

== Exploration and excavation ==
The modern history of this tomb is uncertain. In the 1960s Elizabeth Thomas suggested this tomb was one of the two excavated by Giovanni Belzoni for Lord Belmore, and consequently may be the source of the sarcophagus that Lord Belmore donated to the British Museum. The early Egyptologist James Burton visited the tomb in the early 1800s and noted a red ink inscription, theorised to be a quarry mark. In the 1960s Thomas produced a map of the tomb and mentioned it contained a single Eighteenth Dynasty pot sherd. The tomb was later mapped in the 1980s by the Theban Mapping Project.

The tomb was excavated in 2009 by the University of Basel's Kings' Valley Project. The open shaft contained modern rubbish above older sandy fill. A large boulder filled almost the entire shaft; below it was a wooden docket for fat, and pottery, one sherd of which refit with a vessel from KV26. Two wooden beams and the remains of matting were sitting on top of the fill. The red ink inscription mentioned by Burton was located in the shaft, approximately 1.70 metres (5.6 ft) above the floor, and proved to be a graffito consisting of components of the name Menkheperre (throne name of Thutmose III) although its exact reading is unclear.

The corridor was filled to within 50 centimetres (20 in) of the ceiling. The tomb was used for a burial, presumably in the Eighteenth Dynasty, as within the mixed fill was reed matting, fragments of painted wooden coffins, ostraca, faience, a piece of coloured glass, and cartonnage. The main chamber was only partly filled with debris that included pieces of wooden and stone vessels. The single piece of pottery, the base of a jar, mentioned by Thomas was still present. The far side of the chamber was filled with bat droppings but otherwise clear. The tomb did contain construction marks in the form of red ink outlines of the intended door widths for all the side chambers. The tomb was re-cleared and protective door was fitted to the entrance; it was accurately mapped in 2010 and comprehensively photographed in 2016.
