= KV59 =

Ancient Egyptian tomb, unfinished

- Burial site of Unknown (unused)
- Location within Egypt
- Coordinates: 25°44′18.9″N 32°36′02.3″E
- Location: East Valley of the Kings
- Discovered: Unknown
- Excavated by: Howard Carter? University of Basel (2010–11)
- Decoration: Undecorated
- Layout: Shaft and chamber
- ← Previous; KV58 Next → KV60

Tomb KV59 is an unused tomb located in the Valley of the Kings, in Egypt. It is located in a side valley between KV37 and KV26 and opposite KV31. It is not known for certain when the tomb was discovered or by whom. It was excavated and mapped in 2010–2011 by the University of Basel. The tomb had filled with debris washed in from several floods and the rock was affected by moisture but otherwise it appeared to be unused.

== Location and excavation ==
KV59 is located north of KV37 and KV26 and opposite KV31 in the side valley leading to the tomb of Thutmose III (KV34). It is not known when the tomb was discovered or by whom. It was first noted in the 1880s by Eugène Lefébure and it appears as an unnumbered sketch plan in his publications of the valley. It may have been first excavated by Howard Carter. The location was recorded by the Theban Mapping Project but the site was lost. The tomb entrance was relocated 2 metres (6.6 ft) below the modern ground level.

The tomb was excavated in 2010 and 2011 by the University of Basel's Kings' Valley Project. The shaft was filled with rocky debris. The shaft opened onto a single chamber which contained sediment washed in by several phases of flooding. The resulting moisture affected the surrounding rock, causing part of one wall and the ceiling to collapse. The tomb contained a few pieces of pottery, washed in the past. There is no evidence that the tomb was ever used for a burial. In 2010, an iron door was installed over the entrance to protect the tomb. It was accurately mapped in 2011 following the conclusion of the excavation.
