= KV29 =

Ancient Egyptian tomb in the Valley of the Kings

- Burial site of Unknown
- Location within Egypt
- Coordinates: 25°44′21.5″N 32°36′2.2″E
- Location: East Valley of the Kings
- Discovered: Before 1832
- Excavated by: University of Basel (2011, 2016)
- Layout: Shaft and chamber
- ← Previous; KV28 Next → KV30

Tomb KV29 is an ancient Egyptian tomb in the Valley of the Kings, in the Theban Necropolis of Egypt. It is located near the mid-Eighteenth Dynasty tombs of Tiaa (KV32), Merytre-Hatshepsut (KV42), and Thutmose III (KV34). The tomb was known since the 1830s and given the number KV29 in 1899 but no records of an earlier excavation exist. The entrance shaft was previously planned by the Theban Mapping Project in the 1990s. The tomb was first excavated by the University of Basel King's Valley Project in 2011. Excavation continued in 2016 but the rest of the tomb is filled with debris and its layout is unknown.

== Location and exploration ==
The tomb is located in a small side valley that leads towards the tomb of Thutmose III (KV34) and is close to other tombs of similar date, including the tomb of Thutmose IV's mother Tiaa (KV32) and KV42. Given its proximity to these tombs, it is thought to date to the mid-Eighteenth Dynasty. It has a simple layout consisting of a vertical shaft and a single chamber.

KV29 was known since the 1830s, when its location was noted by the early Egyptologists James Burton and John Gardiner Wilkinson. It was mentioned again in the 1880s by Eugène Lefébure and assigned a tomb number in 1899. In the 1990s the shaft was mapped by the Theban Mapping Project.

== Excavation ==
Excavation of the shaft began in January 2011; half the depth proved to be flood debris from the 1994 flood and modern debris from the 1960s onwards. The rest of the shaft contained clean fill washed in during earlier floods. The final 3 metres (9.8 ft) of debris in the 9 metres (30 ft) deep shaft consisted of hard packed limestone chips; fragmentary ceramics and four pieces of an alabaster jar were recovered from this layer. The shaft was capped with an iron door at the conclusion of the 2011 season.

Excavation resumed in 2016. The shaft was found to open to the west onto a room, also filled with debris. The extent of the room was investigated using a telescoping camera and flashlights. The architectural layout of the room is unknown, as it is so full of debris any possible side chamber doorways are obscured.

== Bibliography ==
- Bickel, Suzanne; Paulin-Grothe, Elina; Alsheimer, Tanja (2011). "Preliminary Report on the Work Carried out During the Season 2011" (PDF). University of Basel. University of Basel Kings' Valley Project.
- Bickel, Suzanne; Paulin-Grothe, Elina (2016). "Report on work carried out during the field season 2015–2016" (PDF). University of Basel. University of Basel Kings' Valley Project.
- Reeves, Nicholas; Wilkinson, Richard H. (1996). The Complete Valley of the Kings: Tombs and Treasures of Egypt's Greatest Pharaohs (2010 paperback ed.). London: Thames and Hudson. ISBN 978-0-500-28403-2.
