= Eugène Lefébure =

French egyptologist (1838–1908)

Eugène Lefébure (11 November 1838 – 9 April 1908) was a French Egyptologist born at Prunoy.

Working with the French Archaeological Mission in the Valley of the Kings, he worked in the tomb of Ramesses IV (KV2). He also documented the tomb of Seti I and drew up plans for KV26, KV27, KV28, KV29, KV37, KV40, and KV59 and also WV24 and WV25. These plans, with the descriptions of their work, were published in the following:

== Publications ==
- “Les Hypogées royaux of Thèbes”, 1889
- Rites égyptiens : construction et protection des édifices, 1996
