= KV26 =

Ancient Egyptian tomb in the Valley of the Kings

- Burial site of Unknown
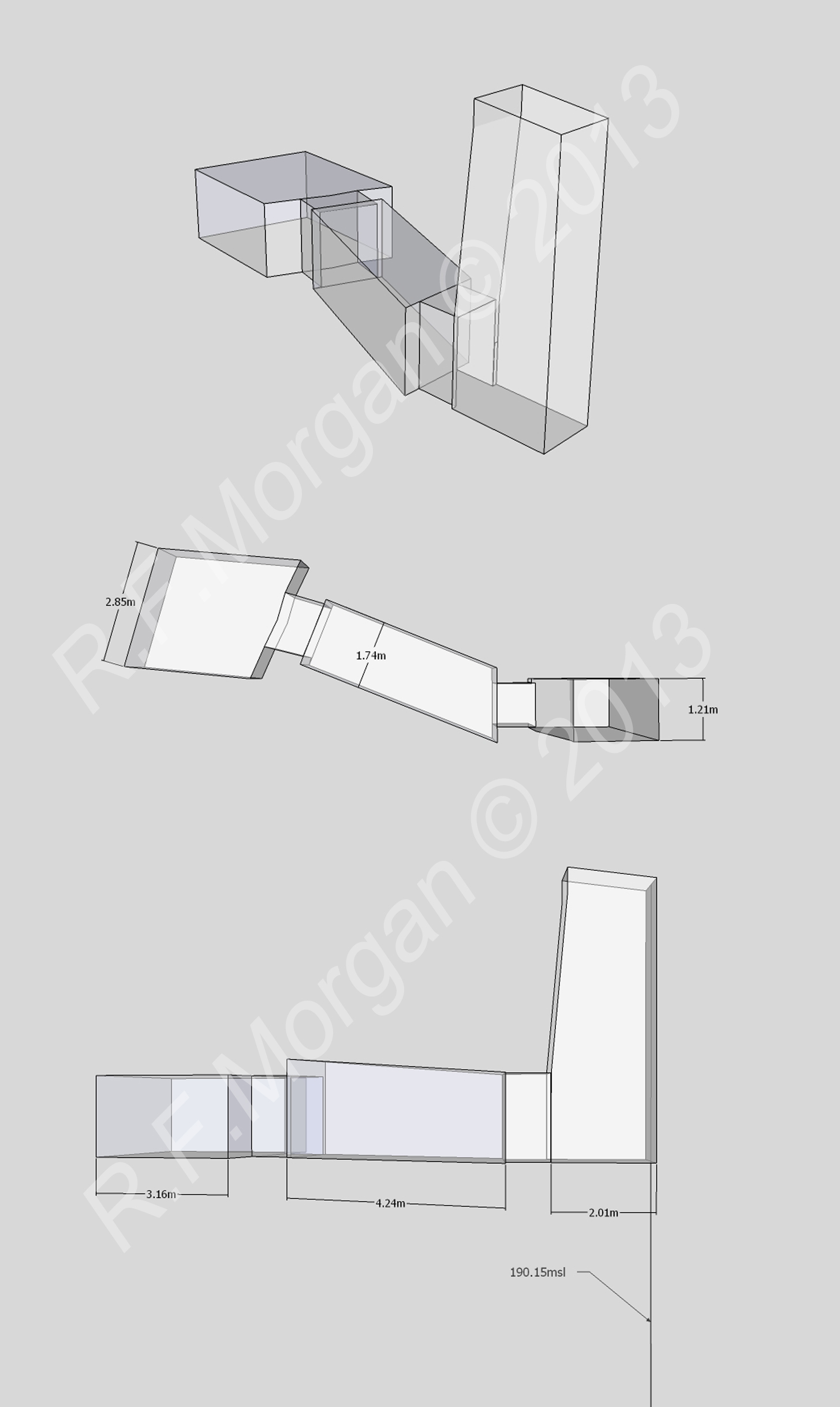
- Schematic of KV26

- Location within Egypt
- Coordinates: 25°44′19.9″N 32°36′02.5″E
- Location: East Valley of the Kings
- Discovered: before 1835
- Excavated by: James Burton(1820s-30s); University of Basel (2009)
- Decoration: Undecorated
- Layout: Shaft and chamber; straight
- ← Previous; WV25 Next → KV27

Tomb KV26 is an ancient Egyptian tomb of the Eighteenth Dynasty located in Egypt's Valley of the Kings. It is located in a side valley leading to the tomb of Thutmose III (KV34). It was visited by the early Egyptologist James Burton in the 1820s or 1830s, and by Victor Loret in 1898. It was mapped in the 1980s by the Theban Mapping Project. The first documented excavation of the tomb was carried out in 2009 by the University of Basel's Kings' Valley Project. The tomb contained evidence of at least one burial and fragmented pottery and stone vessels of mid-Eighteenth Dynasty date but nothing is known about its occupant(s).

== Architecture ==
The layout consists of a vertical shaft, 6 metres (20 ft) deep, which opens onto a corridor that leads to a small room. The entire tomb is short, at only 11 metres (36 ft) long. The shaft and corridor are neatly cut but the chamber is unfinished. It has a lower ceiling that the rest of the tomb, at 1.2 metres (3.9 ft). Although the tomb had been flooded in the past, the limestone is in good condition and unaffected by moisture.

== Exploration and excavation ==
KV26 is located in a side valley leading to the tomb of Thutmose III (KV34) and close to other tombs of similar date, KV32 and KV42. The tomb was first visited by the early Egyptologist James Burton in the 1820s or 1830s, and in 1898 by Victor Loret. It was mapped in the 1980s by the Theban Mapping Project.

The tomb's first documented excavation was conducted in 2009 by the University of Basel's Kings' Valley Project. The open shaft contained modern rubbish above a fill of limestone chip and boulders washed in by flood action. The corridor and chamber were also partly filled with debris. Mixed in with the fill were pieces of ceramics, alabaster jars, faience beads and inlay. The remains of 16 large pottery jars were found scattered throughout the tomb. The jars are not inscribed but can be dated to on stylistic grounds to the reigns of Thutmose III and Amenhotep II.

The tomb was used for at least one burial, as evidenced by pieces of black-coloured Eighteenth Dynasty coffins and fragmentary human remains, including a skull. It had been suggested that the tomb was the original burial place of the noble Sennefer and his wife Senetnay, and that they were transferred from KV26 to KV42 during the dismantling of the royal necropolis at the end of the New Kingdom. However the archaeological evidence suggests that the tomb was entered and probably robbed in the Twentieth or Twenty-first Dynasties (evidenced by fragmentary pottery) but the burials were not reburied elsewhere.

A steel door was installed at the conclusion of the 2009 excavation, and the tomb was accurately mapped in January 2010.

== Bibliography ==
- Bickel, Suzanne; Paulin-Grothe, Elina; Sartori, Nicolas (2009). "Preliminary Report on the Work Carried out During the Season 2009" (PDF). University of Basel. University of Basel Kings' Valley Project.
- Bickel, Suzanne (2010). "Preliminary Report on the Work Carried out During the Season 2010" (PDF). University of Basel. University of Basel Kings' Valley Project.
- Reeves, Nicholas; Wilkinson, Richard H. (1996). The Complete Valley of the Kings: Tombs and Treasures of Egypt's Greatest Pharaohs (2010 paperback ed.). London: Thames and Hudson. ISBN 978-0-500-28403-2.
