= KV41 =

Unexcavated ancient tomb in the Valley of the Kings

- Burial site of Unknown
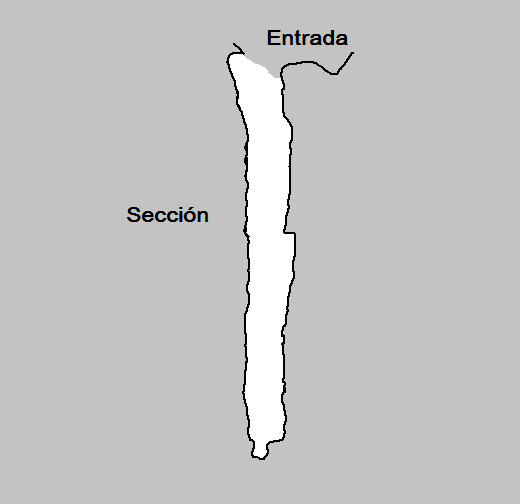
- Approximated schematic of KV41

- Location within Egypt
- Coordinates: 25°44′26″N 32°36′23″E
- Location: East Valley of the Kings
- Discovered: 1899
- Excavated by: Victor Loret
- Layout: Shaft
- ← Previous; KV40 Next → KV42

Tomb KV41, located in the Valley of the Kings in Egypt, was the last tomb to be found by Victor Loret, and has not been excavated or examined. The original owner of this tomb is unclear, but it may have been Tetisheri.

According to Donald P. Ryan, it is not a tomb but rather a deep shaft.
