= KV31 =

Ancient Egyptian tomb in the Valley of the Kings

- Burial site of Unknown
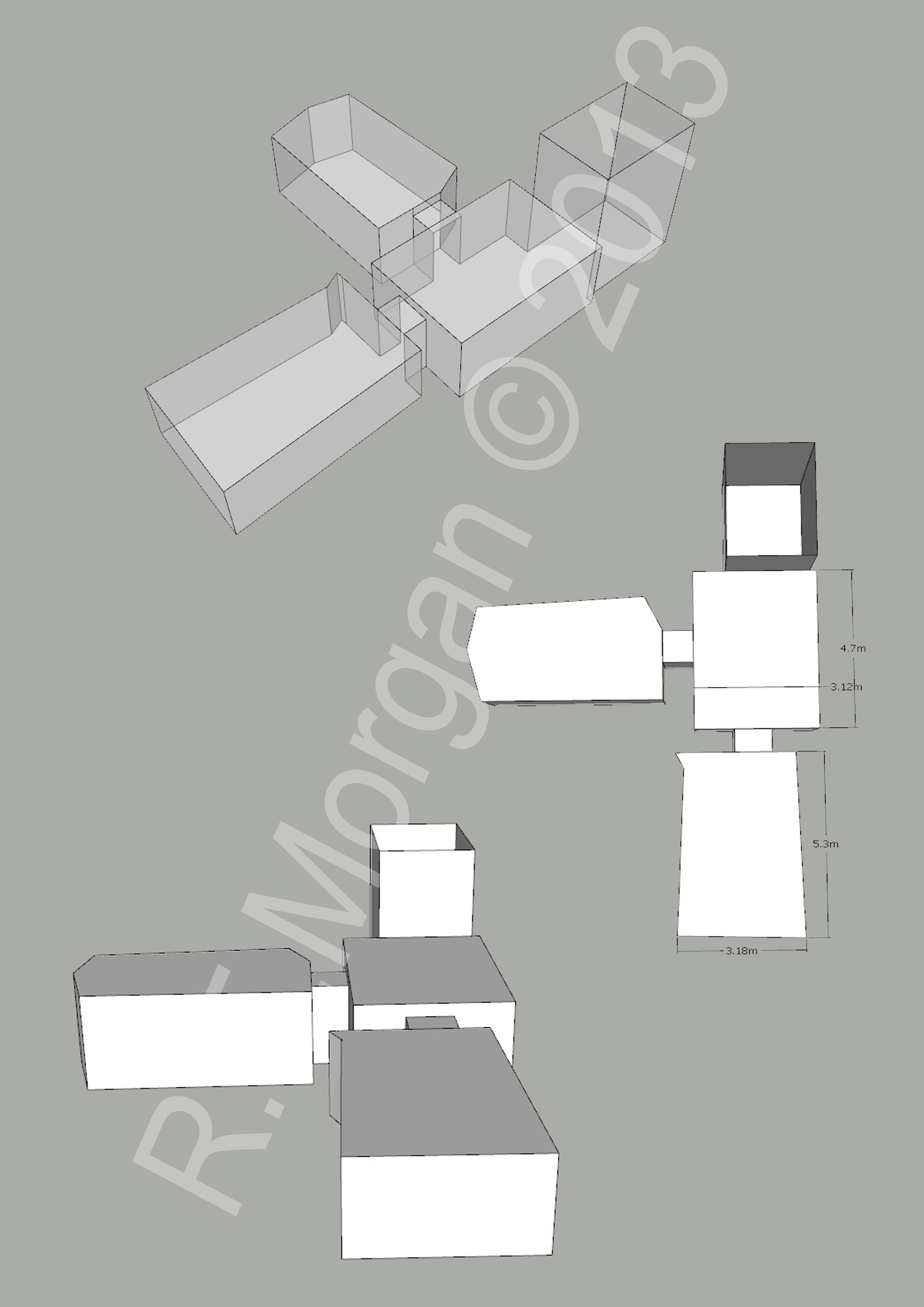
- Schematic of KV31

- Location within Egypt
- Coordinates: 25°44′18.8″N 32°36′02.0″E
- Location: East Valley of the Kings
- Discovered: October 1817
- Excavated by: Giovanni Battista Belzoni? (1817); University of Basel (2010–11)
- Layout: Shaft and chamber(s)
- ← Previous; KV30 Next → KV32

KV31 is an ancient Egyptian tomb located in the Valley of the Kings, near Luxor, Egypt. Only the top of the shaft was known prior to excavation by the University of Basel Kings' Valley Project in 2010, and no earlier excavations are known, although it is suggested that the stone sarcophagus excavated by Giovanni Battista Belzoni in 1817 may have originated from this tomb. The tomb was found to be filled with mixed debris of pottery shards and linen fragments, as well as the remains of five mummified elite individuals dating to the Eighteenth Dynasty.

== Architecture ==
The tomb consists of a vertical shaft which leads to a chamber that has an additional two rooms leading from it. The majority of the tomb is cut from good quality limestone bedrock; the first chamber is partly cut from bedrock and partly from conglomerate.

== Exploration and excavation ==
The tomb was likely one of two (the other being KV30) tombs excavated in 1817 by Giovanni Battista Belzoni on behalf of Second Earl Belmore. If this is correct, it may be the origin place of a stone sarcophagus donated by Belmore to the British Museum. It was numbered by Victor Loret in 1898 but no excavation is known.

In January 2010 the University of Basel Kings' Valley Project began their excavation of the tomb, of which only the upper portion of the shaft was known. The shaft proved to be well-cut and descends 5 metres (16 ft) through both accumulated conglomerate and bedrock; the fill within the shaft contained modern rubbish above limestone chips, sand, and rocky debris. Three pots containing Nile mud used for sealing the door of the tomb were found at the bottom of the shaft. The shaft opens onto a main chamber with two adjoining rooms, which were found filled throughout with debris to a depth of at least 1 metre (3.3 ft).

It was immediately apparent that the tomb was thoroughly robbed in the past, as pieces of broken funerary items were scattered around. The remains of several mummies and their wrappings were found within the side chambers. A metal door was installed over the shaft at the conclusion of the excavation to protect the tomb and prevent water and debris from re-entering. The tomb was mapped in the 2010 and 2011 seasons.

== Contents ==
The fill in all the rooms was found to contain the same mix of broken pottery, from white-washed and decorated jars, wooden fragments from coffins, large quantities of linen bandages and natron bags and other textiles, and the unwrapped remains of mummies. Also found were fragments from two canopic jars, one of calcite and one of limestone; the latter was inscribed but the space for the owner's name was blank. A piece of a dummy jar inscribed for Sennefer was also encountered. Organic materials, including wood and fabric were found to be in excellent condition. The tomb likely dates to the reigns of Thutmose III and Amenhotep II during the mid-Eighteenth Dynasty. Later finds in the tomb include ostraca, a piece of linen embroidered with the cartouche of Ramesses III, and an ushabti from the Twentieth Dynasty.

=== Mummies ===
Within the two side chambers were found five mummies: two women and three men, all between the ages of 18 and 30. As there are no names with the mummies, each was given a designation based upon the room in which they were found (room C or room D). The unwrapping and scattering of the bodies was likely the work of tomb robbers, both ancient and modern. The mummies were likely unwrapped during the Third Intermediate Period, while the removal of heads and hands is attributed to more modern robbers looking for pieces to sell to early tourists. The report suggests that given the large quantity of pottery recovered from the tomb, these mummies were all originally interred together. The style of mummification seen in the individuals conforms to that seen in the elites of the mid-Eighteenth Dynasty.

==== Mummy C1 ====
This body is female, and 18–25 years old at death based on the degree of epiphysial fusion and the unworn nature of her teeth. Her body is 159–160 centimetres (5.22–5.25 ft) long and her height in life is estimated to have been 155–165 centimetres (5.09–5.41 ft). Short silky black hair remains on her head. The ears have been plugged with linen. Her organs were removed through an incision and the torso filled with dense packing; her brain does not appear to have been removed. The body was damaged by ancient robbers, with her face smashed and her head, right hand, and left foot disarticulated; the limbs are fractured and several fingers and toes are missing. Robbers evidentially cut through the bandages with a sharp blade, as cut marks are seen on the head and on the back of the shoulders. The front wall of the torso was also removed and cut marks are seen on the torso stuffing.

==== Mummy C2 ====
This individual is likely to be a young male aged 20–25 years based on the fusion of the epiphyses and the slightly worn teeth. The body measures 159 centimetres (5.22 ft) and the height in life based on the measurements of the long bones is 165 centimetres (5.41 ft). The front half of the head is covered with layers of linen bandages but they are missing on the back of the head, revealing braided hair. The ears may have been plugged; the brain appears not to have been removed. The organs have been removed and the torso is stuffed with rolls of resin-soaked linen. This body retains much of its bandaging, with the arms and legs preserving at least a dozen layers of fabric. The body is separated into several pieces, with the head and pelvis with the legs being separated from the torso and arms. Cut marks left by robbers are visible in the bandage layers of the face and thighs; a portion of the front wall of the torso has been removed. The body exhibits several post-mortem fractures and parts of both hands and parts of the left foot are missing.

==== Mummy C3 ====
This mummy is likely to be male. His headless body was found with his arms crossed over his chest, with the fingers of the left hand clenched, in the manner of a king. This individual is estimated to be 18–25 years old with a height in life of 175 centimetres (5.74 ft). The torso is stuffed with a dense substance. Thick bandaging is preserved on the right leg from mid thigh to mid calf. Both feet are missing, as is the right hand; the limbs show multiple fractures and dislocations.

==== Mummy C4 ====
Body "C4" is the largely intact body of an individual who is possibly male although no genitalia are seen. The body is 154 centimetres (5.05 ft) long with an estimated stature in life of approximately 160 centimetres (5.2 ft). His hair is short save for longer strands on the right side, suggesting the side-lock of youth. The teeth are a little worn but the wisdom teeth have not erupted; the bottom jaw is completely missing. The left arm is broken but present while the right arm is entirely missing. The legs are dislocated at the knee and feet. The embalming incision may be vertical, which possibly dates the mummy to before the reign of Thutmose III. Cut marks left by robbers are seen on the back of the hip.

==== Mummy D1 ====
This is the highly fragmented body of an adult aged 20–30 years. The individual is possibly female, although this is uncertain. Only the skull, parts of the spine, shoulder blades, sternum, right upper arm, one leg and part of the pelvis remain. The grouping is based on the fact the leg and pelvis portions match, and the presence of a spare head. A living height of 155 centimetres (5.09 ft) based on limb measurements is estimated for a male individual. The brain was not removed. The hair on the head is short and reddish, possibly due to bleaching during embalming. A part of the genitals (possibly male) may be preserved on the left side although ancient damage complicates this. The leg belonged to an individual who was likely fat in life, as the skin is folded over in places.
