= KV33 =

Ancient Egyptian tomb in the Valley of the Kings

- Burial site of Unknown
- Location within Egypt
- Coordinates: 25°42′17.1″N 32°36′02.7″E
- Location: East Valley of the Kings
- Discovered: 1898
- Excavated by: Victor Loret; University of Basel (2012)
- Decoration: Undecorated
- Layout: Stairs and chamber(s)
- ← Previous; KV32 Next → KV34

Tomb KV33 is an ancient Egyptian tomb in the Valley of the Kings in Egypt. It is located close to the tomb of Thutmose III, KV34. The tomb dates to the mid-Eighteenth Dynasty and was used for the burial of an unknown individual. The layout is simple, consisting of descending steps and a main chamber with two adjoining rooms. KV33 was discovered by Victor Loret in 1898. The small tomb was open to visitors in the early 1900s when it was described in a tourist guidebook. In modern times, a bench was built over the entrance. In 2012 the tomb was excavated for the first time by the University of Basel's Kings' Valley Project.

== Location and architecture ==
KV33 is located close to KV34, the tomb of Thutmose III, high in the cliffs at the end of a side valley. Its layout has been known since the early 1900s when it was described in Baedeker's travel guidebook as being a "small tomb with two empty rooms, reached by a flight of steps." The tomb is neatly cut with three separate sets of staircases that descend further into the earth. The separate architectural factors of the tomb are labeled A-J with some subdivisions that are labeled Ja-Jc. KV33 starts with a west to east orientation before making a sudden turn to continue a northern descent.

== Exploration and excavation ==
KV33 was discovered in 1898 by Victor Loret. The tomb was open to tourists in the early 1900s as it is mentioned in a Baedeker's guidebook to Egypt. In modern times, a bench was built over the entrance.

KV33 was excavated in 2012 by the University of Basel's Kings' Valley Project. The modern bench covering the entrance was removed. The tomb is entered via 10 well-cut steps that descend into a central chamber, off which are two side rooms. The tomb was filled with debris to a height of 1.2 metres (3.9 ft), washed into the tomb in two separate layers. Clearance of the fill yielded large stones probably used to seal the entrance, pieces of pottery and alabaster jars, and fragmentary human remains. The tomb can be dated to the Eighteenth Dynasty on the basis of pottery style, most likely to the reign of Thutmose III.The tomb itself was undecorated and according to researcher Elizabeth Thomas, it is theorized that the tomb could have been dug for Thutmes III as a subsidiary burial. The tomb itself has never been used and with a lack of content potential, there haven't been any fully planned excavations for this tomb.
