= KV37 =

Ancient Egyptian tomb in the Valley of the Kings

- Burial site of Unknown
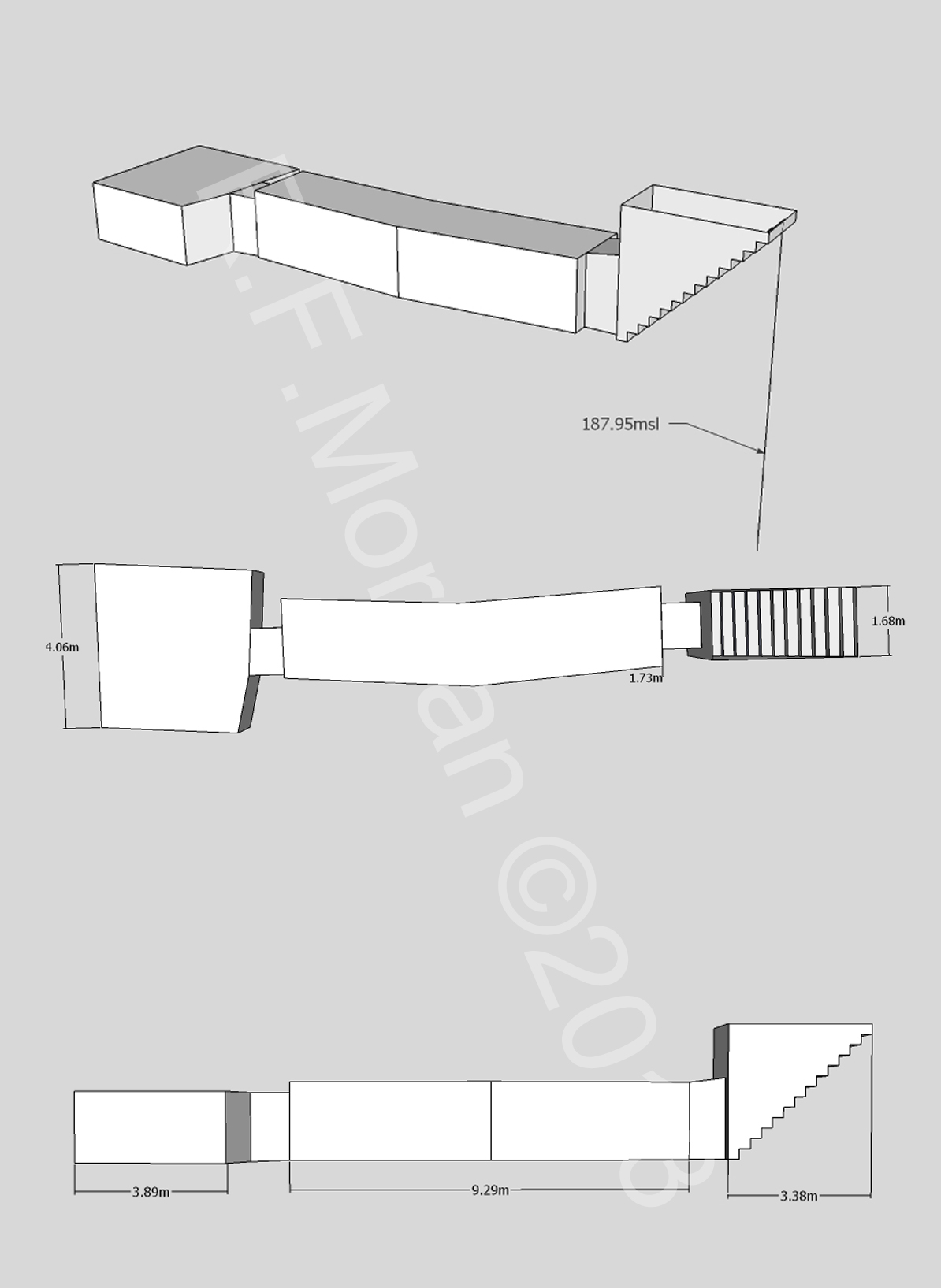
- Schematic of KV37

- Location within Egypt
- Coordinates: 25°44′18.6″N 32°36′02.5″E
- Location: East Valley of the Kings
- Discovered: 1899
- Excavated by: Victor Loret (1899); University of Basel (2016–17)
- Layout: Straight axis
- ← Previous; KV36 Next → KV38

Tomb KV37 is an ancient Egyptian tomb in the Valley of the Kings near Luxor, Egypt. Bone fragments and white-washed storage jars indicate that the tomb was used for a burial, probably in the Eighteenth Dynasty. However, its original occupants are unknown.

== Location, discovery and excavation ==
KV37 is located in a side branch of the southern side valley, just below the tomb of Thutmose III (KV34). Cut into the cliff base near the stairs to KV34, it is now well below the modern ground level. The tomb was discovered by Egyptologist Victor Loret in 1899; his excavation mentioned finds of ostraca and artefacts bearing the names of Thutmose IV and Seti I. The tomb also evidently contained pottery vessels, that Elizabeth Thomas noted.

=== Re-excavation ===
The University of Basel Kings' Valley Project re-cleared the tomb during their 2016–2017 field season. Part of the fill on the north side had to be excavated to access the tomb, as it lies several metres below the modern ground level; no artefacts were encountered in this fill. The stairs were covered with modern debris, rubbish, and sherds of Eighteenth Dynasty pottery. The tomb's interior also contained flood-washed debris to a depth of several centimetres; the single room was covered with a layer of fine sand. The pieces of pottery observed by Thomas were found gathered in the centre of the chamber. The pottery was recovered, cleaned, and reassembled, with an initial estimate of twenty jars. Further study revised this estimate to twenty-nine jars, some pieces of which were badly eroded. The tomb itself was mapped and extensively photographed; several masons' marks in red paint were noted on the walls of the entrance passageway. At the conclusion of the investigation, an iron door was fitted at the base of the stairs to prevent the tomb from filling with debris.
