= KV40 =

Tomb of Egyptian 18th Dynasty royal family

- Burial site of 18th Dynasty royal family members
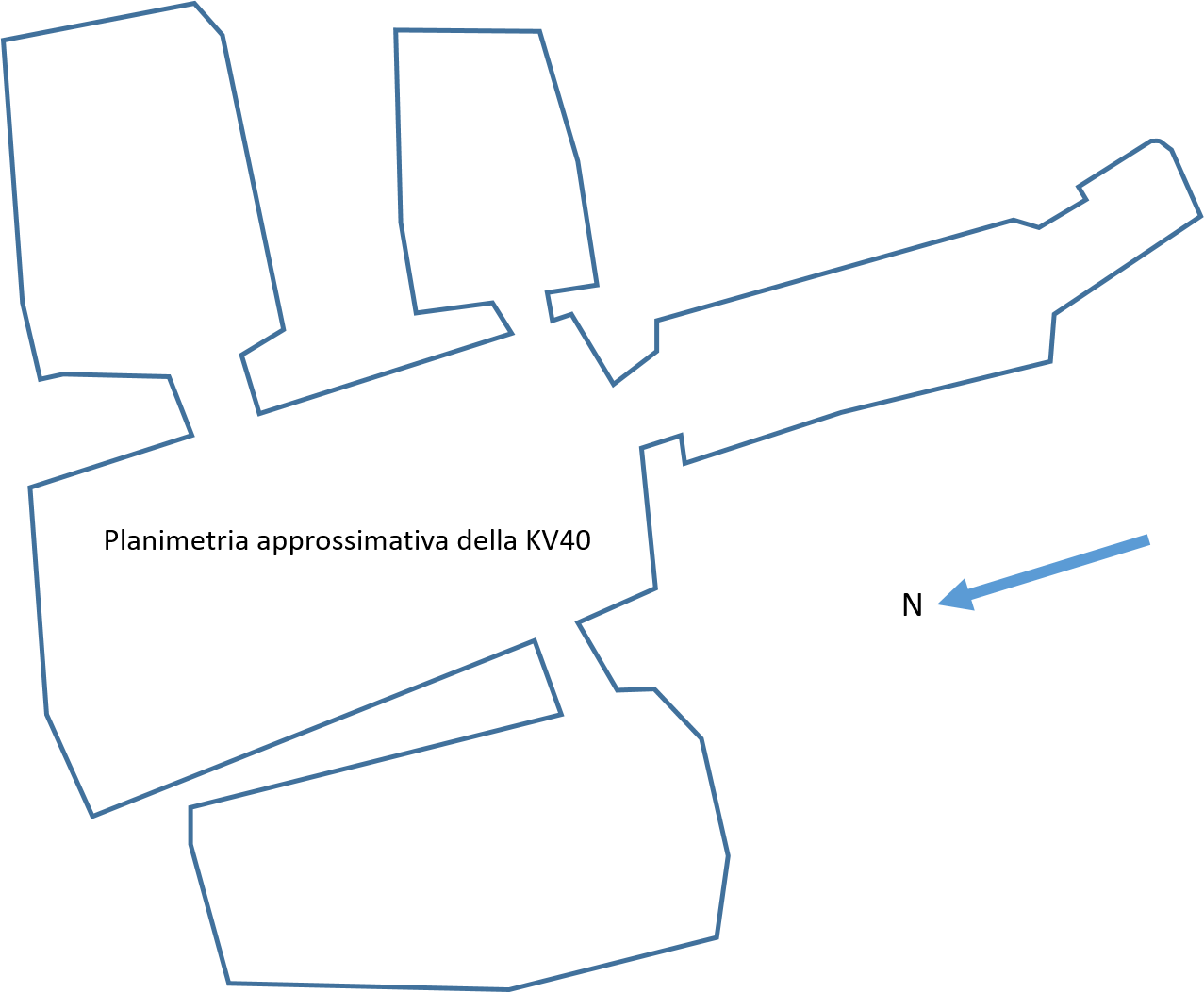
- Floorplan of KV40. The caption reads, "approximate plan of KV40" in Italian.

- Location within Egypt
- Coordinates: 25°44′20.1″N 32°36′01.9″E
- Location: East Valley of the Kings
- Discovered: 1899
- Excavated by: Victor Loret (1899); University of Basel
- Decoration: Undecorated
- Layout: Shaft and chamber(s)
- ← Previous; KV39 Next → KV41

Tomb KV40 is located in the Valley of the Kings, in Egypt. Artifacts from the tomb attribute it to 18th Dynasty royal family members, though human remains from the later 22nd Dynasty were interred. Although the tomb was excavated by Victor Loret in 1899, no report was published.

Excavations in 2014 revealed the remains of at least 50 minor royalty in several chambers. While the tomb was looted several times in antiquity and at the end of the nineteenth century, it still contains many fragments of funerary equipment, such as wooden and cartonnage coffins and textiles.

== Excavations of 2014 ==
On 28 April 2014, the Egyptian Minister of State for Antiquities announced the discovery by an Egyptian–Swiss archaeological team of at least 50 mummies in the center chamber and in three side chambers of KV40. Based on inscriptions on storage jars, Egyptologists identified more than thirty people.

The mummies in KV40 come from both the 18th and the 22nd Dynasty. The royal titles found on many jars indicated that the buried were members of the families of Thutmosis IV and Amenhotep III, both of whom also are interred in the Valley of the Kings. The analysis of the hieratic inscriptions points to hitherto unknown royal princesses, four princes, and several foreign women, mostly adults. Mummified children have also been found. The royal princes and princesses are said to be from the house of the royal children in the inscriptions.

In a lecture at the Museo Egizio (2015), Dr. Bickel indicated that so far twelve royal daughters had been identified. Names include the King's daughter Neferunebu and the King's daughter Nefertari, as well as the King's Son Meri-taui. One of the women was identified as the King's Daughter Taemwadjes, then one of the royal son, which indicates she was a granddaughter of the King. There are also women who are not obviously royal. Some women have clear foreign names from the Near East and Nubia.

The findings in the 2014 excavations include a linen sock which was made to be worn in sandals and fragments of funerary equipment.
