= Victor Loret =

French Egyptologist (1859–1946)

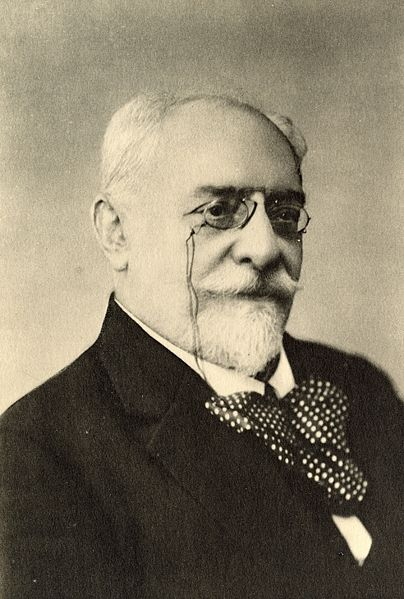
- Born: Victor Clement Georges Philippe Loret; 1 September 1859; Paris, France
- Died: 3 February 1946 (aged 86); Lyon, France
- Education: École des Hautes Études
- Known for: being the Head of the Egyptian Antiquities Service, and his excavations in the Valley of the Kings.
- Scientific career
- Fields: Egyptologist, archaeologist

Victor Clement Georges Philippe Loret (1 September 1859 – 3 February 1946) was a French Egyptologist.

== Biography ==
His father, Clément Loret, was a professional organist and composer, of Belgian origin, who had been living in Paris since 1855. He stayed in Egypt several times and published his first book, L'Égypte aux temps des pharaons, in 1898.

Loret studied with Gaston Maspero at the École des Hautes Études. In 1897 he became the head of the Egyptian Antiquities Service. In March 1898, he discovered KV35, the tomb of Amenhotep II in the Valley of the Kings. Amenhotep II's mummy was still located in his royal sarcophagus but the tomb also proved to hold a cache of several of the most important New Kingdom Pharaohs such as Thutmose IV, Amenhotep III and Ramesses VI. The cache of Royal Mummies had been placed in KV35 to protect them from looting by tomb robbers by the 21st Dynasty High Priest of Amun, Pinedjem.

In 1920 he examined the Great Zimbabwe in what was then the British colony of Southern Rhodesia where he claimed that the Alfred Charles Auguste Foucher's earlier examinations were accurate. This has proven controversial because Alfred Charles Auguste Foucher claimed that the Great Zimbabwe ruins (and the Khami ruins) were built by Phoenicians and not by the ancestors of the Bantu people who are a majority of the region's inhabitants. These views were later challenged by Gertrude Caton Thompson.

Loret also discovered tombs KV32, KV33, KV36, KV38, KV40, KV41 and KV42. His claim to have discovered KV34 is disputed by some Egyptologists who believe that honour should instead be awarded to one of his local foremen.

He died in Lyon, France, on 3 February 1946, at the age of 86. He donated some of his archives to the University of Lyons, but a majority to his favorite student, Alexandre Varille.

== Literature ==
- Morris L. Bierbrier: Who was who in Egyptology. 4th revised edition. Egypt Exploration Society, London 2012, ISBN 978-0-85698-207-1, pp. 337–338.
- Victor Loret, Patrizia Piacentini, Christian Orsenigo, Stephen Quirke u. a.: La Valle dei Re riscoperta: I giornali di scavo di Victor Loret (1898–1899) e altri inediti (= Le vetrine del sapere. Band 1). Imprimeria della Università degli Studi di Milano, Milano 2004, ISBN 88-7624-201-5.
