= KV42 =

Ancient Egyptian tomb of Sennefer of Thebes

- Burial site of Hatshepsut-Meryetre
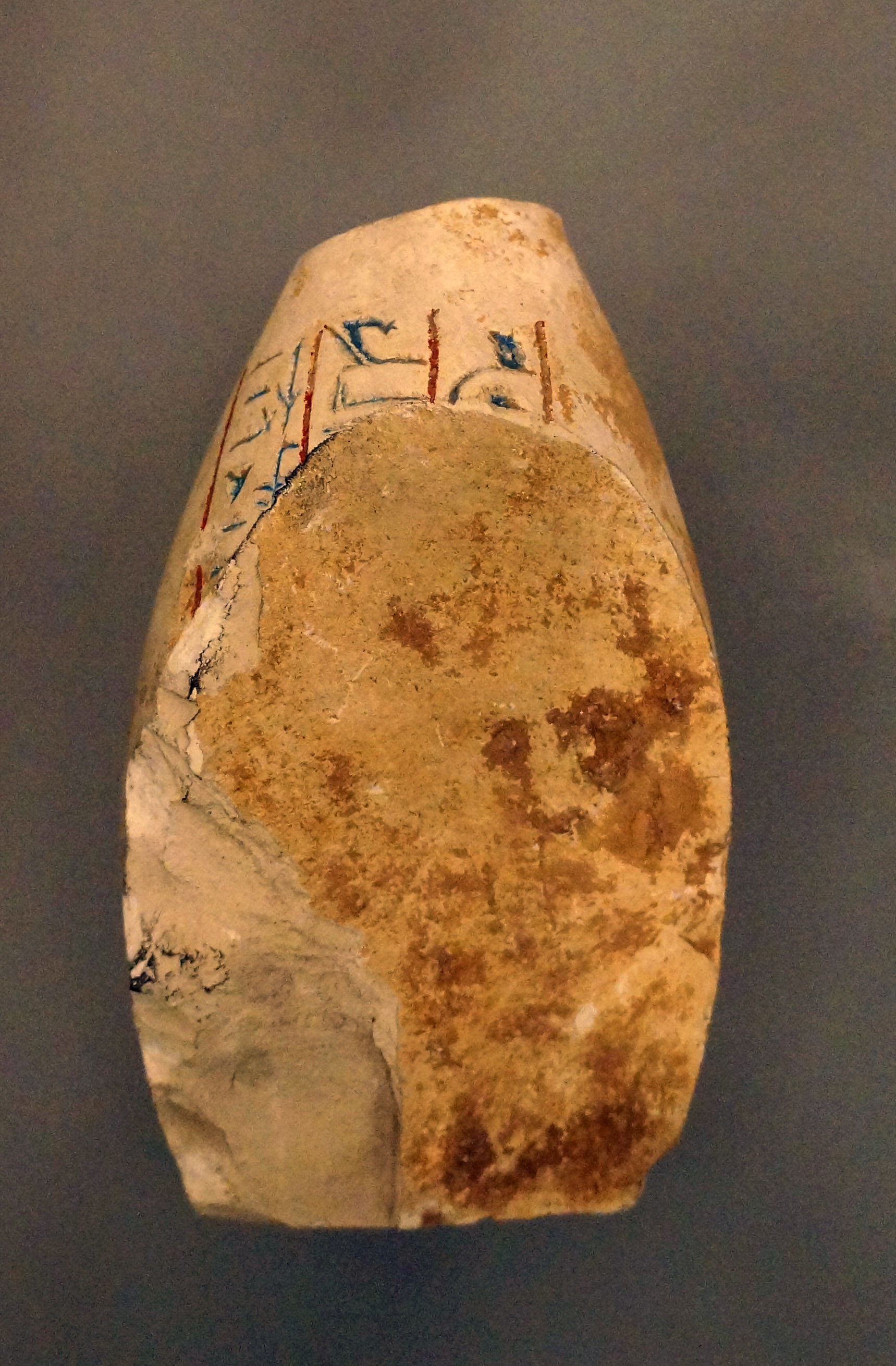
- Fragment of a model jar

- Location within Egypt
- Coordinates: 25°44′17.1″N 32°36′02.6″E
- Location: East Valley of the Kings
- Discovered: 9 December 1900?
- Excavated by: Victor Loret (1899?); Howard Carter (1900, 1921)
- Layout: Bent-axis
- ← Previous; KV41 Next → KV43

Tomb KV42 (Kings Valley 42) is an ancient Egyptian tomb in the Valley of the Kings near Luxor, Egypt. It was constructed for Hatshepsut-Meryetre, the wife of Thutmose III, but she was not buried in the tomb. It may have been reused by Sennefer, a mayor of Thebes during the reign of Amenhotep II, and by several members of his family. The tomb has a cartouche-shaped burial chamber, like other early Eighteenth Dynasty tombs.

== Discovery, layout, and contents ==
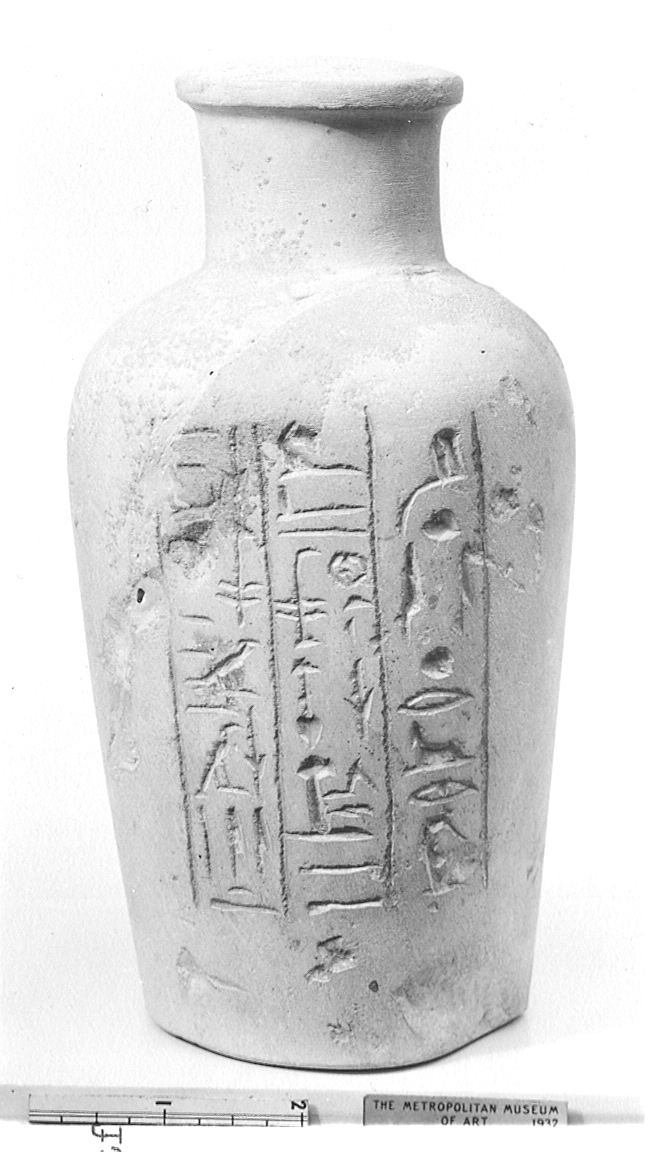
A model vessel inscribed for Sennefer and Senetnay

The tomb was uncovered by two local Copts, Chinouda Macarios and Boutros Andraos, in late 1900; they obtained an excavation permit through their statement that they knew the location of a tomb. However, Howard Carter notes in his report that "I doubt the secret was really their own, as the site was discovered by and known to Monsieur Loret some eighteen months previously, and probably their informations was obtained from his workmen." The excavation commenced on 27 November 1900 and the blocking in the doorway was officially taken down on 9 December. Only the lower part of the door sealing was original, the rest being composed of fallen rock. It was immediately apparent that the tomb had suffered from ancient robbing and had been inundated with water.

On inspecting the interior, the former plundering of this tomb was only too evident, for the funereal furniture, vases, and Canopic jars, were mashed and lying about the ground of the passages and chambers, evidently just as the former robbers had thrown them, some being partly buried in the fine yellow mud, now dry, which had covered the floors of the lower chambers.

The cartouche-shaped burial chamber contained an unfinished stone sarcophagus, the lid of which was propped up with a piece of wood. The tomb contained a set of well-preserved canopic jars belonging to Sentnay, the wife of Sennefer. Analysis of the remnants of the embalming balm from two of these jars housed in Museum August Kestner, Germany, identified they were composed of a complex blend of plant oils, beeswax, fat, bitumen, and Pinaceae and dammar or Pistacia resins, many of which were imported into Egypt. A set of fragmentary jars were located, along with an alabaster offering table, both inscribed for a woman named Baketra who bore the title "royal ornament". Additionally, four canopic jar lids in the form of bearded heads were found which Carter suggested belonged to Sennefer. An unspecified number of model vessels inscribed for both Sennefer and Sentnay were also found. The wood once present in the tomb had rotted, though there was evidence of sledge-style bases and wooden coffins, the ivory inlay of which "was impossible to preserve, as, on being touched, it instantly fell to pieces." Carter suggested that the tomb was robbed for its metal during the Twenty-second Dynasty, as the foreman found "some gold leaf and an exquisite gold inlay rosette, probably the bottom part of a menat wrenched off..." in the upper passageway. He also suggested that the tomb had been reentered "in comparatively late times," as antiquities were found scattered on the dry mud inside and many pottery vessels were encountered sitting on the steps outside the burial chamber. The small room off the burial chamber contained approximately twenty to thirty whole and broken earthenware jars, some of which were still sealed. Carter thought the space might contain a burial shaft as there was a dip in the floor but excavation proved this was not the case.

Only the burial chamber was decorated. Part of the ceiling is covered with yellow stars on a blue background; in the rest of the room only the upper parts of the walls containing the dado and khekher-frieze were painted.

=== Graffito ===
A graffito inscription occurs at the entrance of the KV42:

3rd month of summer, day 23: work was begun on this tomb by the necropolis team, when the scribe Butehamun went to the town to see the general's arrival in the north.

This may record the uncovering and emptying of the tomb on the orders of Piankh, the High Priest of Amun, either for reburial elsewhere or as part of a state-sanctioned campaign of robbery.

== Intended ownership ==
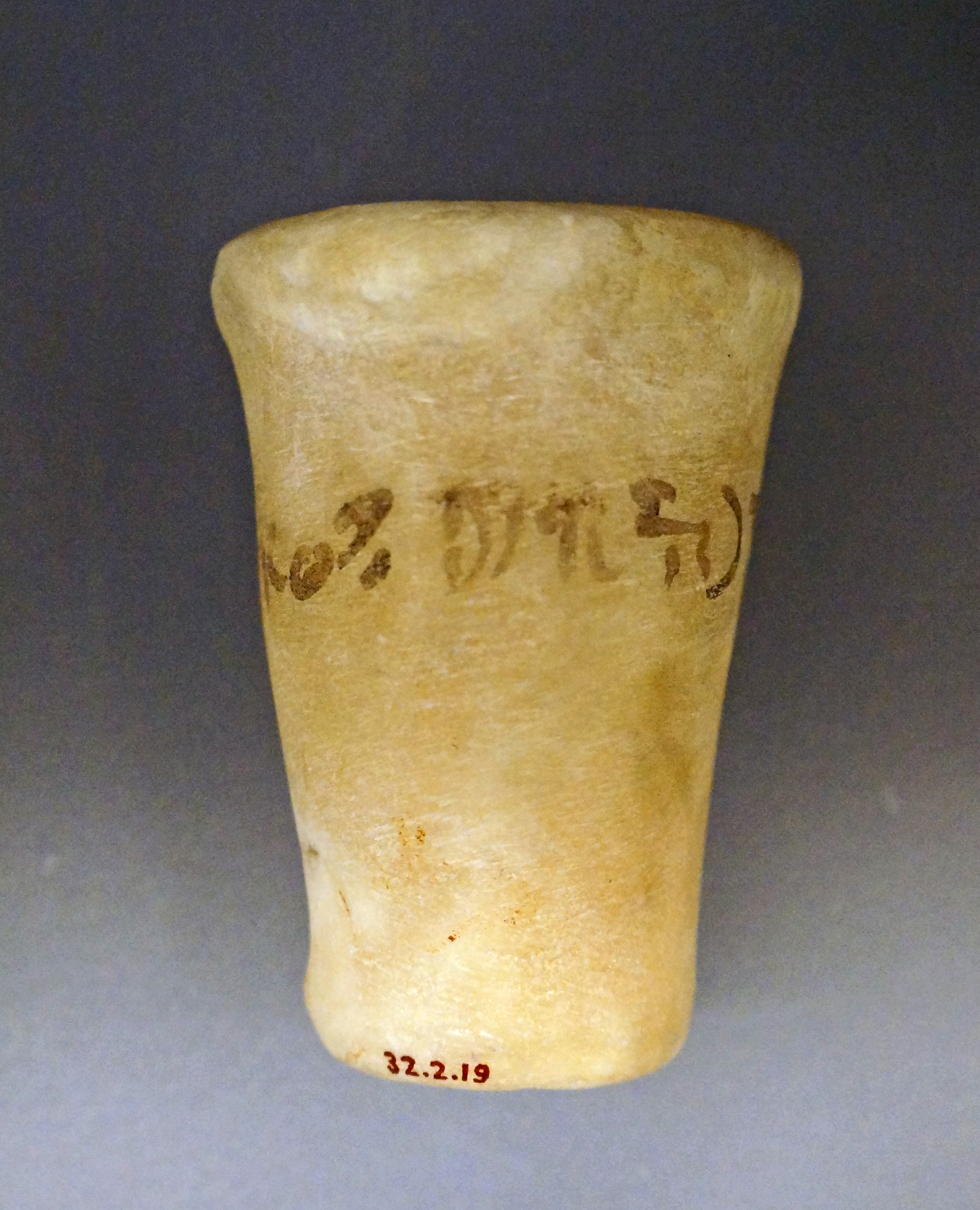
Model jar inscribed for Merytre-Hatshepsut

There is no agreement on the original owner of the tomb. The unfinished quartzite sarcophagus is seen as an indication that the tomb may have at some point been intended for Thutmose II, who was ultimately buried in the nearby Western Wadis. However, no trace of royal funerary equipment was found in the tomb, making it doubtful that the tomb was ever used for a royal burial. The lack of the customary figural decoration with scenes from the Amduat, which in this period were only executed after the funeral, also supports the idea this tomb was never used. The discovery of foundation deposits by Carter in 1921 point to the intended owner being Queen Merytre-Hatshepsut. Unusually, the vessels in this foundation deposit are inscribed in hieratic written in ink instead of the usual incised, blue pigment-filled hieroglyphs. This may indicate the vessels are secondary, to claim the tomb left vacant by Thutmose II. If the tomb ever held the body of Thutmose II, it would have been usurped from the queen.

=== Sennefer and Senetnay ===
Carter ascribed the tomb to Sennefer, a mayor of Thebes, based on the presence of a set of canopic jars belonging to Sentnay, four male canopic jar lids, and numerous model vessels inscribed for the pair. Catherine Roehrig, in her tracing of the tomb's contents, proposed that Sentnay, as the royal nurse of Amenhotep II, was originally granted a burial elsewhere in the Valley and later re-interred in KV42 with two other individuals as part of a cache, possibly as late as the 21st Dynasty. Nicholas Reeves sees the presence of parts of the original blocking and the storage jars as proof that the tomb was used for a primary burial. He suggests that Sennefer and Sentnay were granted use of the tomb by Amenhotep II, something which Marianne Eaton-Krauss considers highly unlikely given that Yuya and Tjuyu, the parents in-law of Amenhotep III were granted a much smaller, undecorated tomb (KV46) despite their close relationship to the king.
