= KV32 =

Ancient Egyptian tomb of Tia'a, wife of Amenhotep II

- Burial site of Tia'a
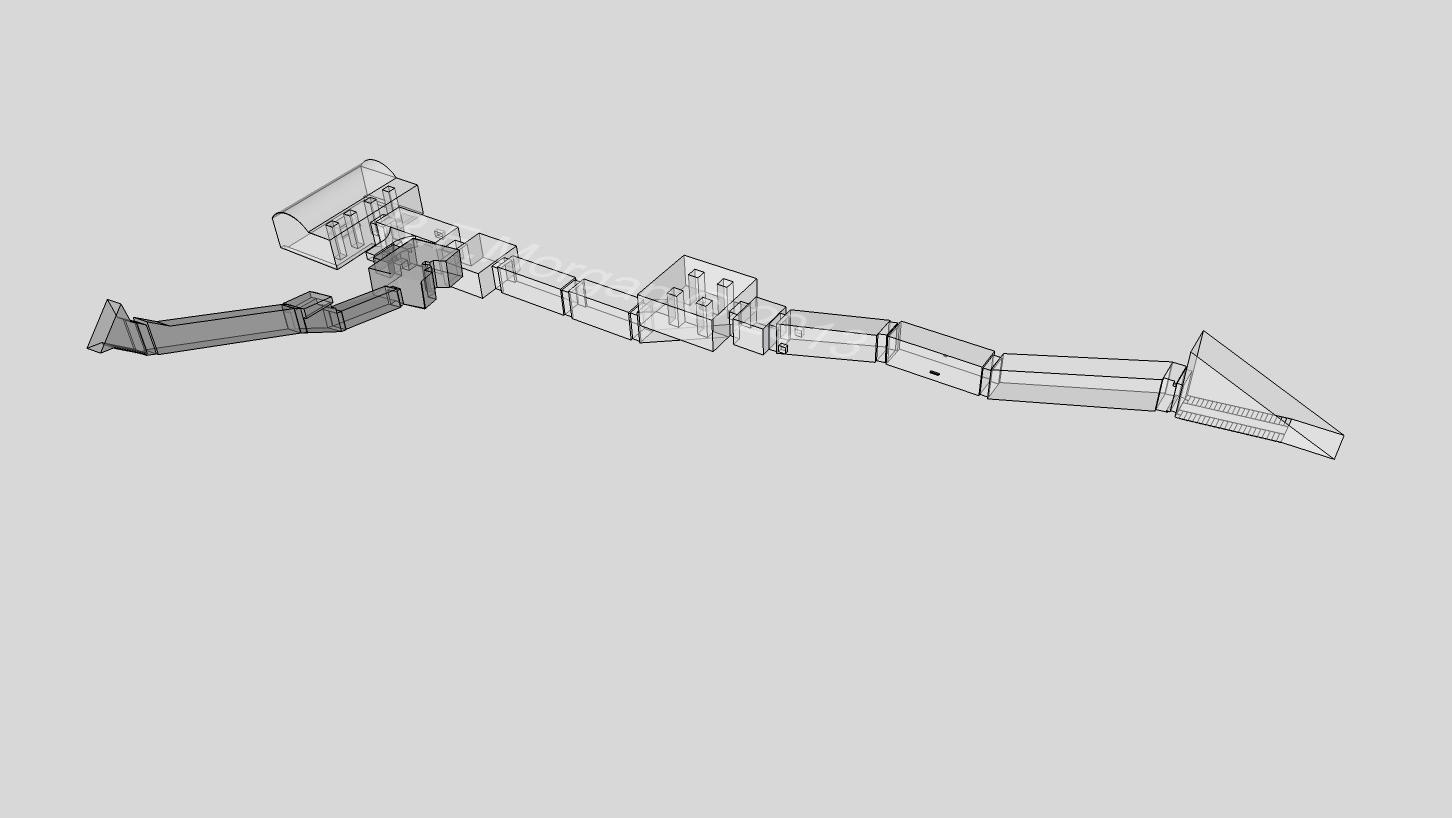
- Schematic of KV32 and KV47

- Location within Egypt
- Coordinates: 25°44′18.1″N 32°36′01.8″E
- Location: East Valley of the Kings
- Discovered: 1898
- Excavated by: Victor Loret; MISR Project University of Basel
- Layout: Straight axis
- ← Previous; KV31 Next → KV33

Tomb KV32, located in the Valley of the Kings in Egypt, is the burial site of Tia'a, the wife of Amenhotep II and mother of Thutmose IV.

The tomb was discovered in 1898 by Victor Loret. It is an undecorated tomb and runs back some 40 metres into the mountainside with a burial chamber (6.24 x 8.56 x 4.01 m) at the end. A portion of it was penetrated by workmen digging the original burial chamber in the tomb of Siptah KV47.

KV32 has been fully cleared, excavated and published by a team from the University of Basel's MISR Project. The finds in the tomb include hundreds of fragments of a canopic chest and fragments of lids with a human head for covering the potholes that contained the entrails of the queen. Other finds include shabtis and shabti miniature coffins with the name of the queen. Vases with the name of the mayor of Thebes, Sennefer and those of his wife Sentnay were also found.

== Bibliography ==
- Hanna Jenni, and Andreas Dorn, and Elina Paulin-Grothe, and David Aston: Das Grab der Königin Tiaa im Tal der Könige (KV 32). Swiss Egyptological Studies, SES, 1. Basel 2021. (online: https://edoc.unibas.ch/81215/)
