= Theban Mapping Project =

The Theban Mapping Project (TMP) is an archaeological endeavor devoted to Ancient Egypt. It was established in 1978 by the Egyptologist Dr. Kent R. Weeks at the University of California, Berkeley. In 1985, it was moved to the American University in Cairo. The Project's original goal was to create an archaeological map of the Valley of the Kings, and that was published as the Atlas of the Valley of the Kings in 2000. Since 2001, the Project has also developed a management plan for the Valley of the Kings, which is funded by the World Monuments Fund.

The website had not been online for several years, due to lack of funding. However, with new funds having been made available by the American Research Center in Egypt, it went online again in January 2021, with new features and data.

In 2011, Dr. Weeks founded the TMP Library. It includes books in English and Arabic on Egyptology, archeological methodology, conservation, and management plans of sites around the world. It was originally located in a small house down a small lane. In 2021, as a result of multiple donations, the library was relocated to a new multi-story building and more recently Dr. Weeks was able to established a laboratory for archaeological preservation and study.

== See also ==
- Amarna Royal Tombs Project
