= KV34 =

Tomb of Egyptian Pharaoh Thutmose III

- Burial site of Thutmose III
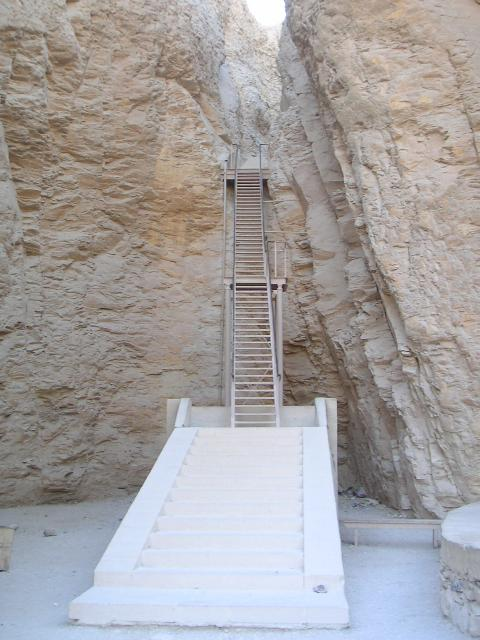
- Entrance to KV34

- Location within Egypt
- Coordinates: 25°44′17.5″N 32°36′02.3″E
- Location: East Valley of the Kings
- Discovered: 1898
- Excavated by: Victor Loret
- Decoration: Litany of Ra, Amduat
- Layout: Bent-axis
- ← Previous; KV33 Next → KV35

Tomb KV34 (Arabic: مقبرة تحتمس الثالث, romanized: Maqbarat Tahtamis al-Thaalithi) in the Valley of the Kings (near the modern-day Egyptian city of Luxor) was the tomb of 18th Dynasty Pharaoh Thutmose III. The tomb was plundered in antiquity and its location lost. It was rediscovered and first excavated in 1898 under Victor Loret.

== Layout and history ==
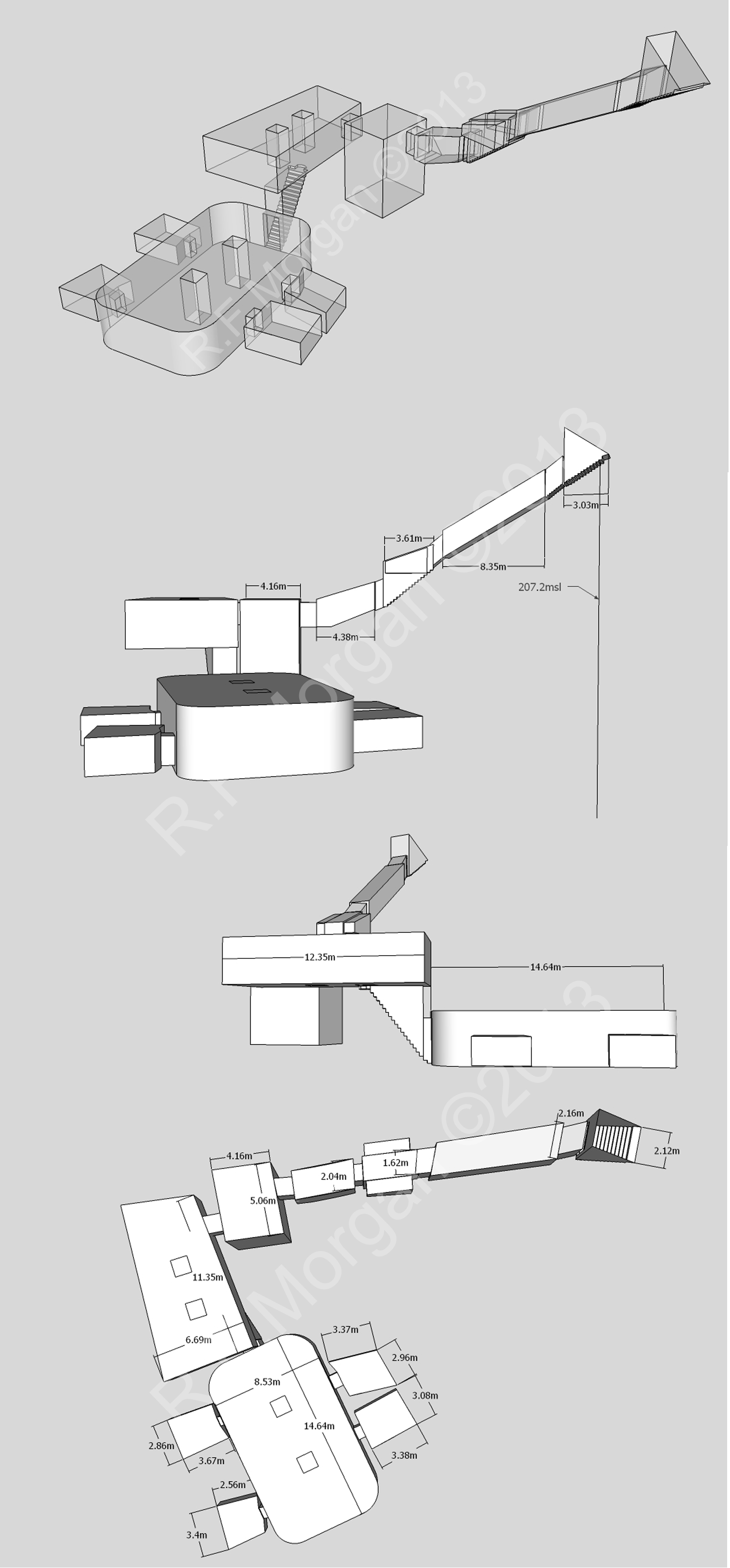
Isometric, plan and elevation images of KV34

One of the first tombs to be dug in the Valley, it was cut high in the cliff face of the furthermost wadi. On the way up the staircase to the tomb, on the cliff wall, is graffiti done by workmen building the tomb. A steep corridor leads down, in a dog-leg shape, from the entrance past a deep well. The well, intended to throw off potential tomb robbers, was later adapted in the tombs of Thutmose's successors. Passing across the well leads to a trapezoidal antechamber.

Beyond the antechamber lies the cartouche-shaped burial chamber, the first pharaonic tomb to have that shape, although later tombs reverted to a rectangular shape. In the burial chamber, there stand four smaller side chambers. The stone sarcophagus in which Thutmose's body was placed is still in place in the burial chamber, albeit damaged by tomb robbers.

Many of the wall decorations are in an unusual style that, other than KV35 (the tomb of Thutmose III's son, Amenhotep II), is not found elsewhere in the Valley of the Kings. On a yellow-tinged background (intended to resemble aged papyrus), one of the earliest known versions of the Amduat is traced, depicting the ancient Egyptian deities as simple (almost naive) stick figures, with text written in the cursive hieroglyphic book hand used more commonly for sacred texts on papyrus. The Litany of Ra also appears in the burial chamber, with a similar execution.

== Gallery ==
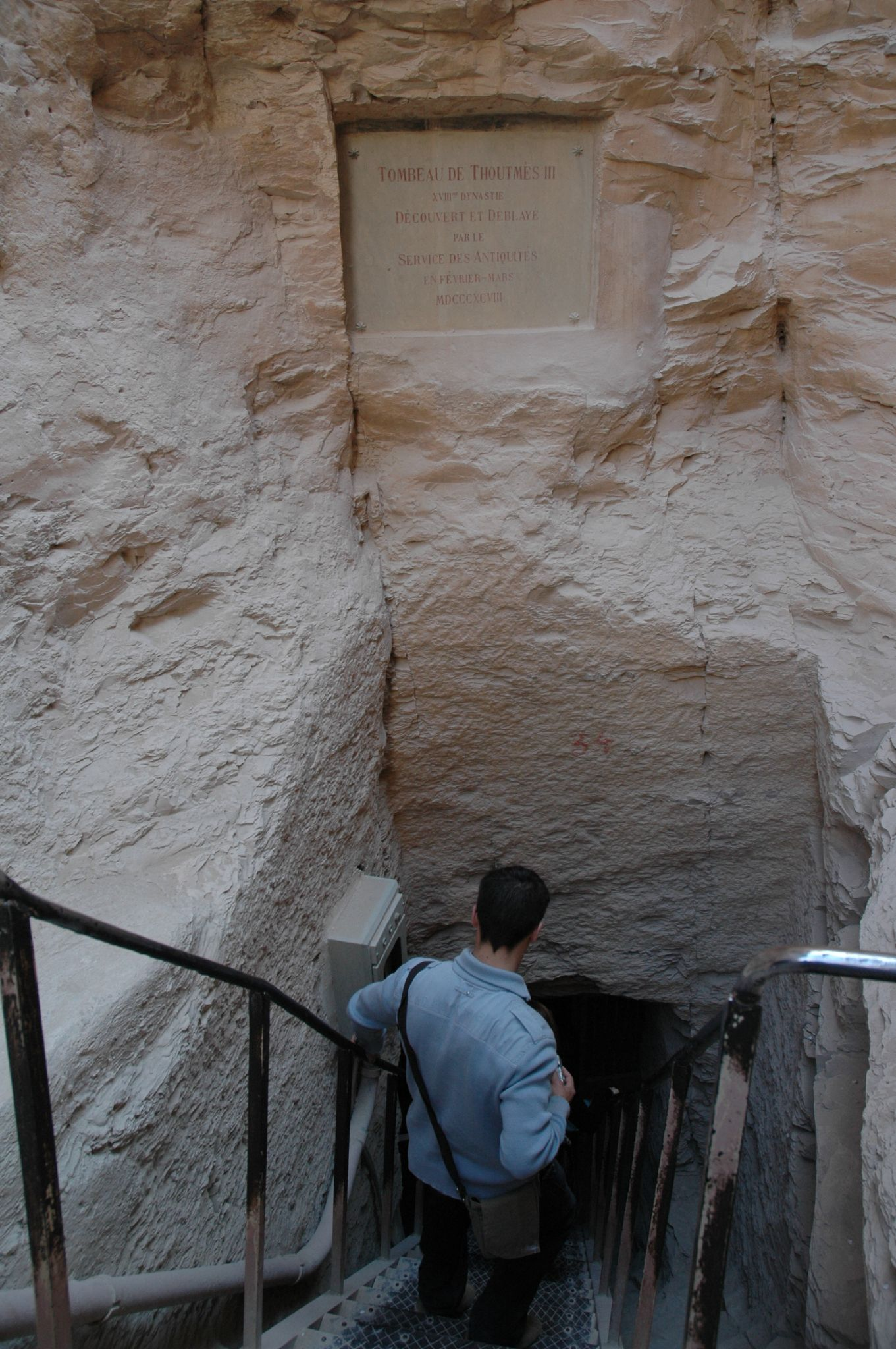
The steep entrance to KV34

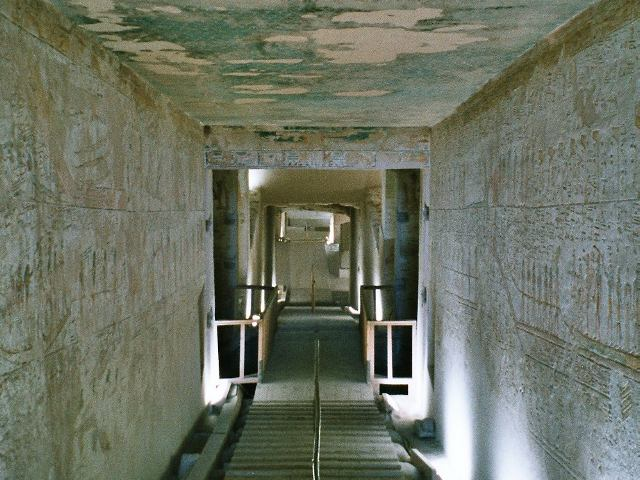

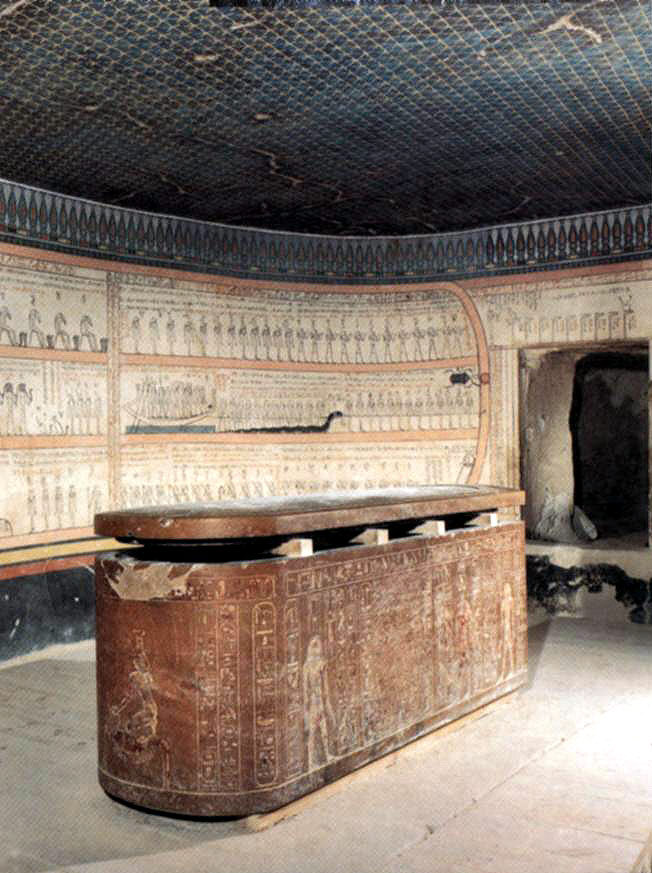

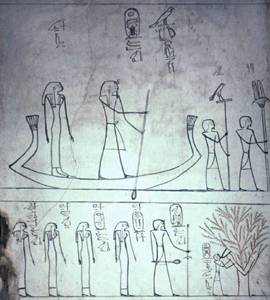

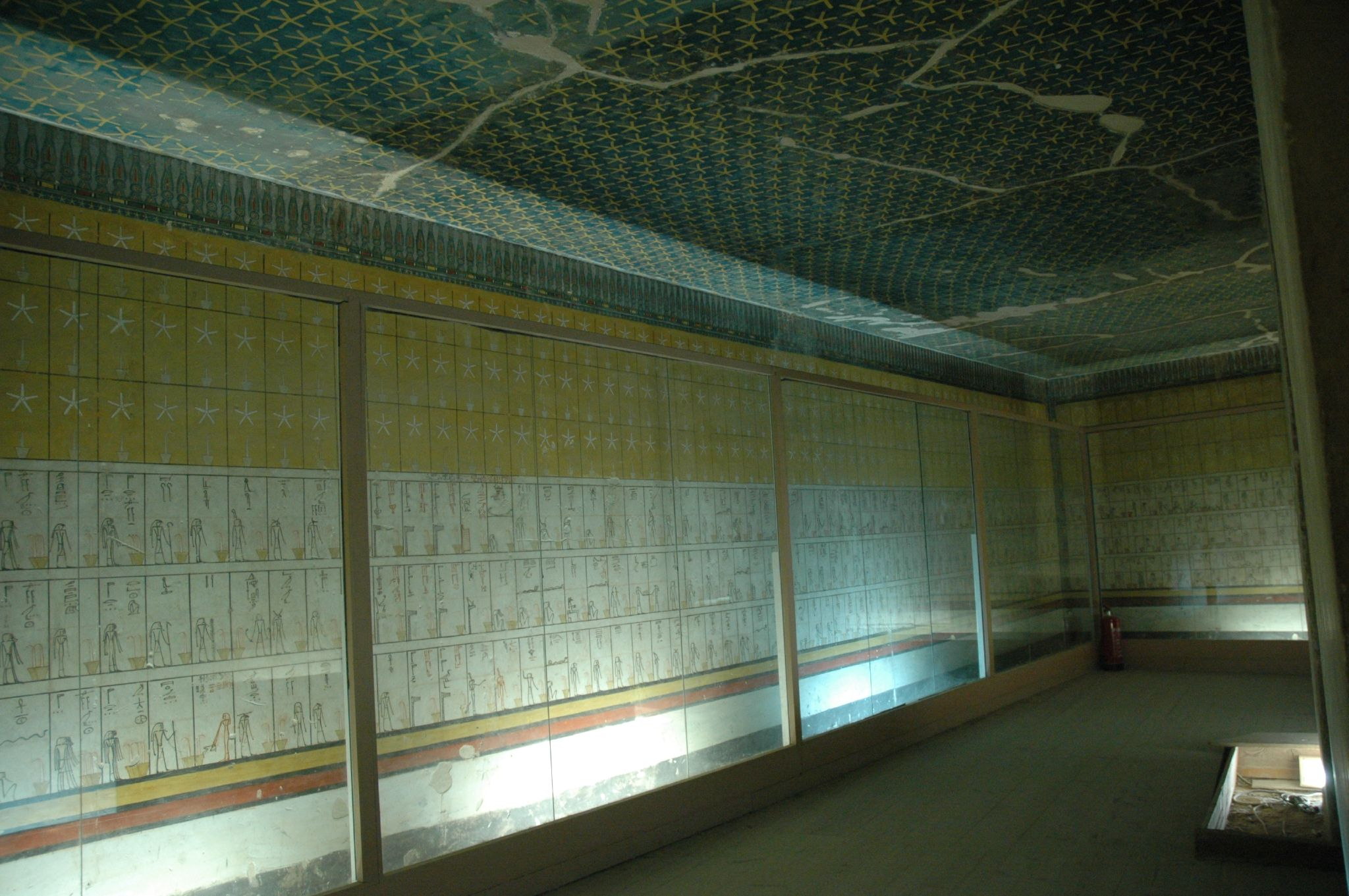
Interior view of Thutmose III's tomb

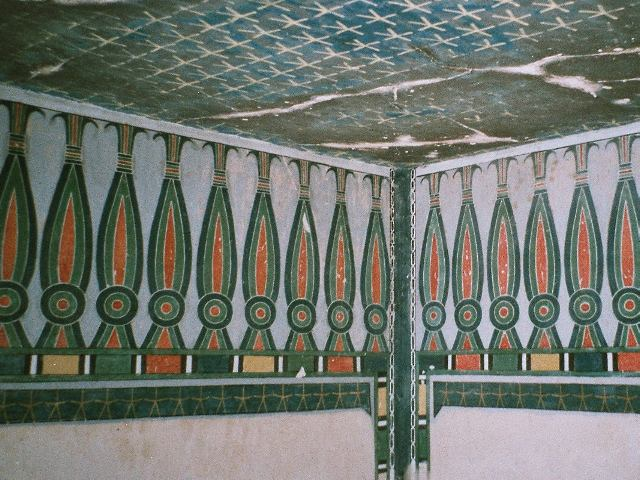

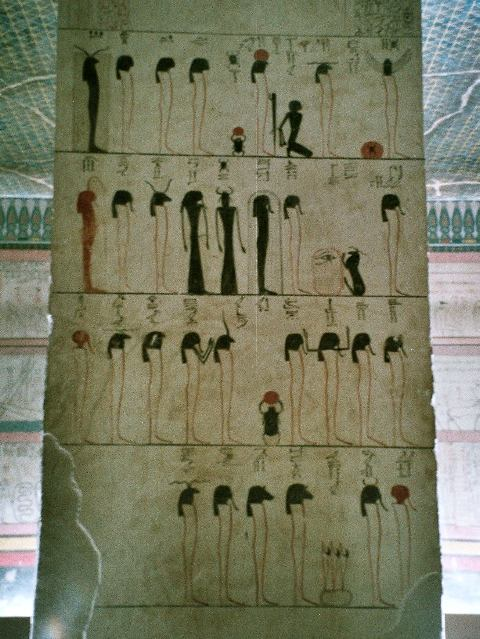

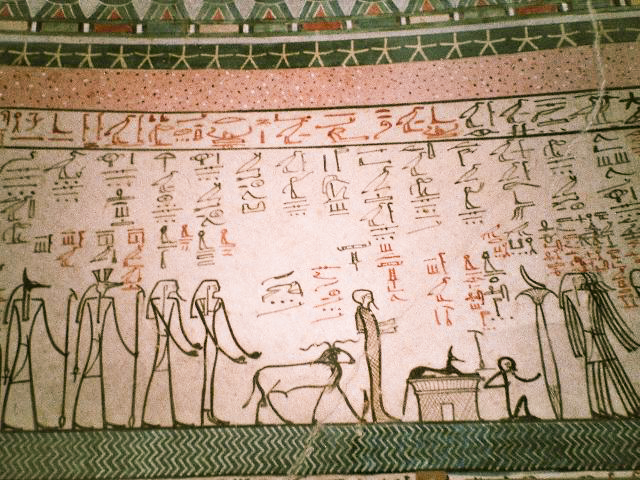

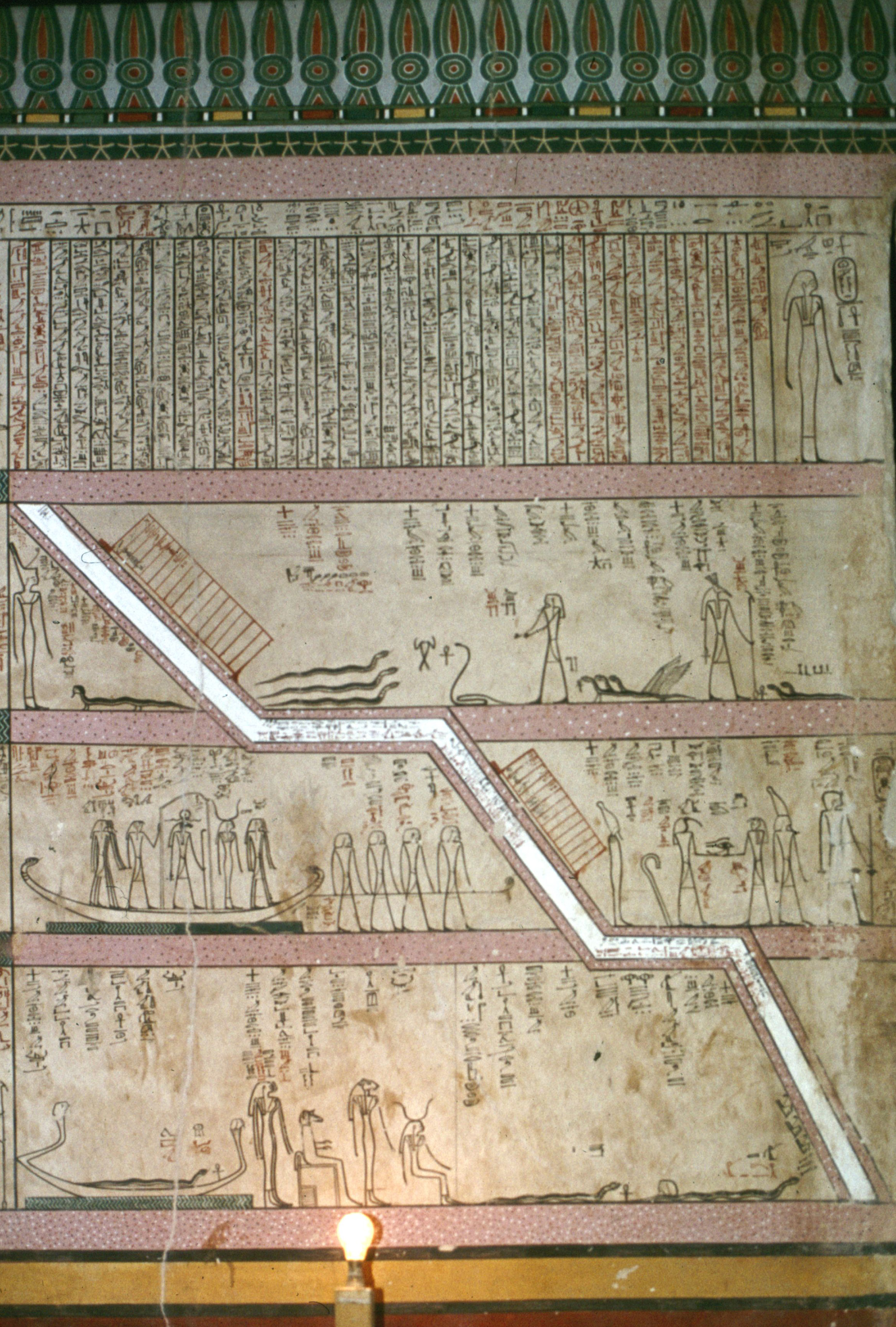

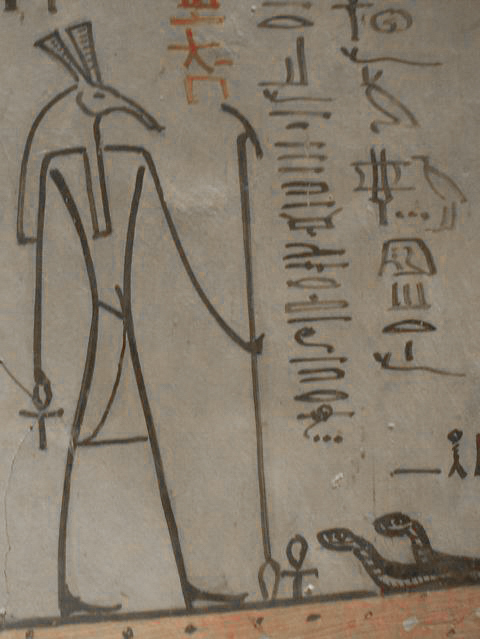
Seth

Horus

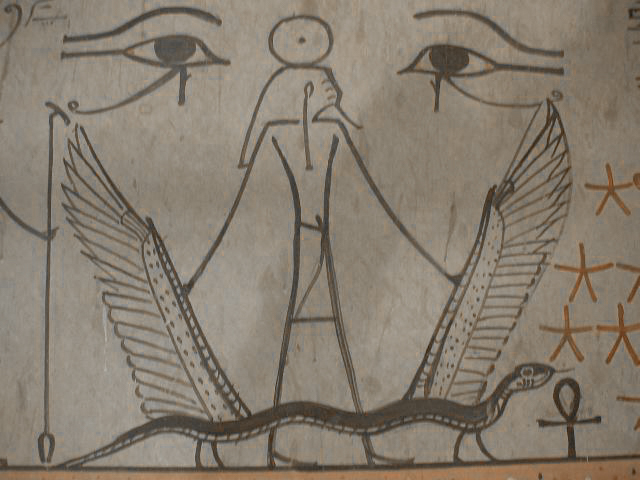
Ka of Thutmose III

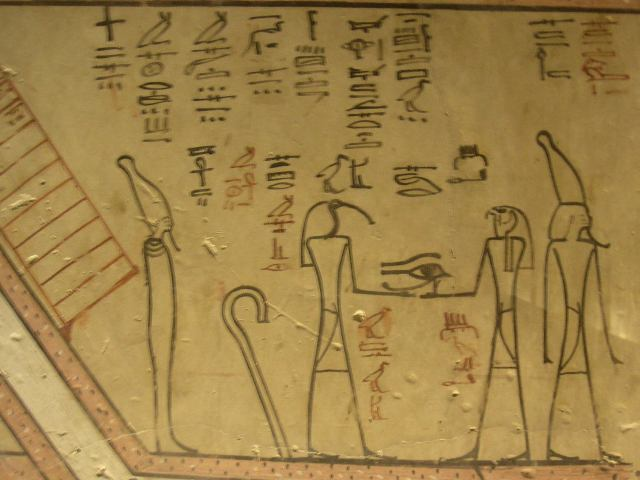

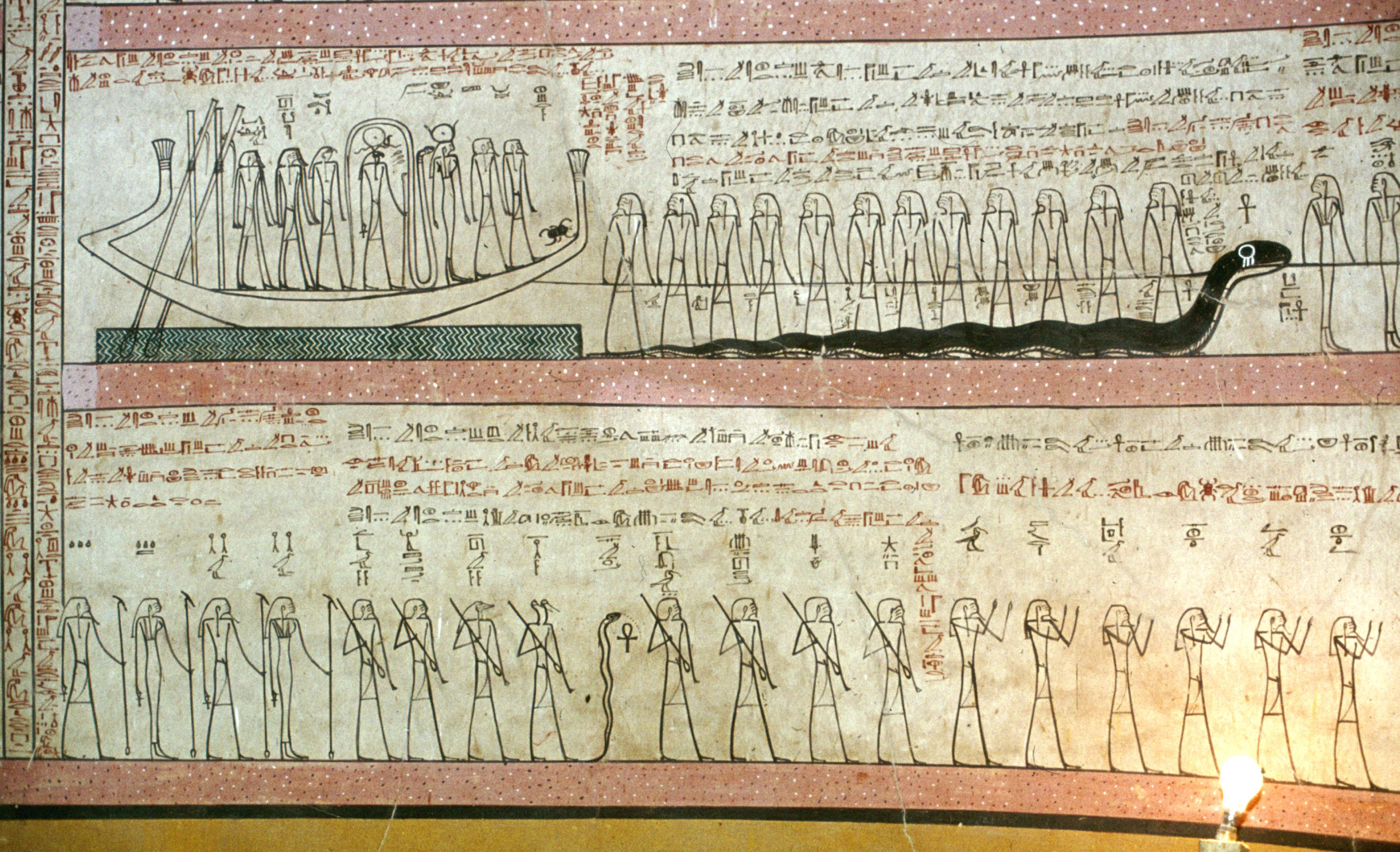

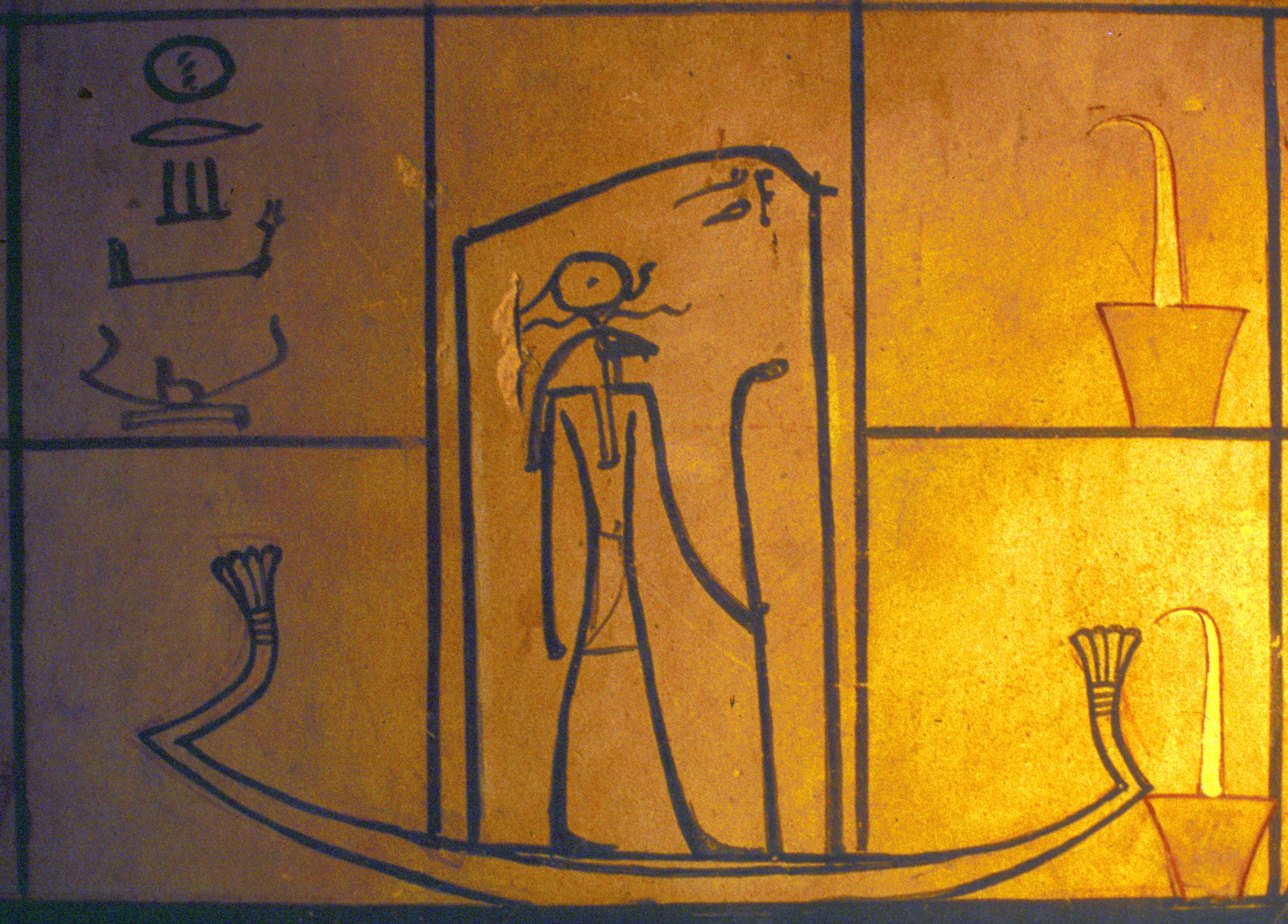

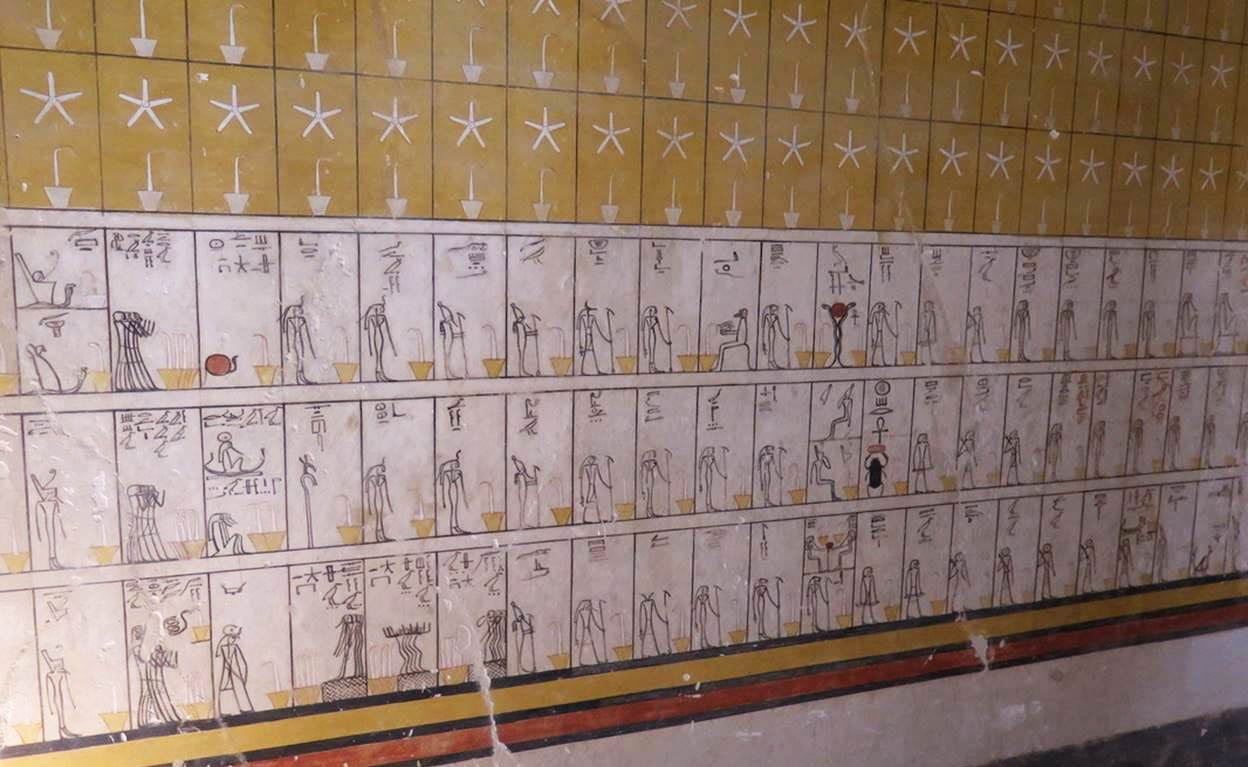
Painted reliefs in KV34

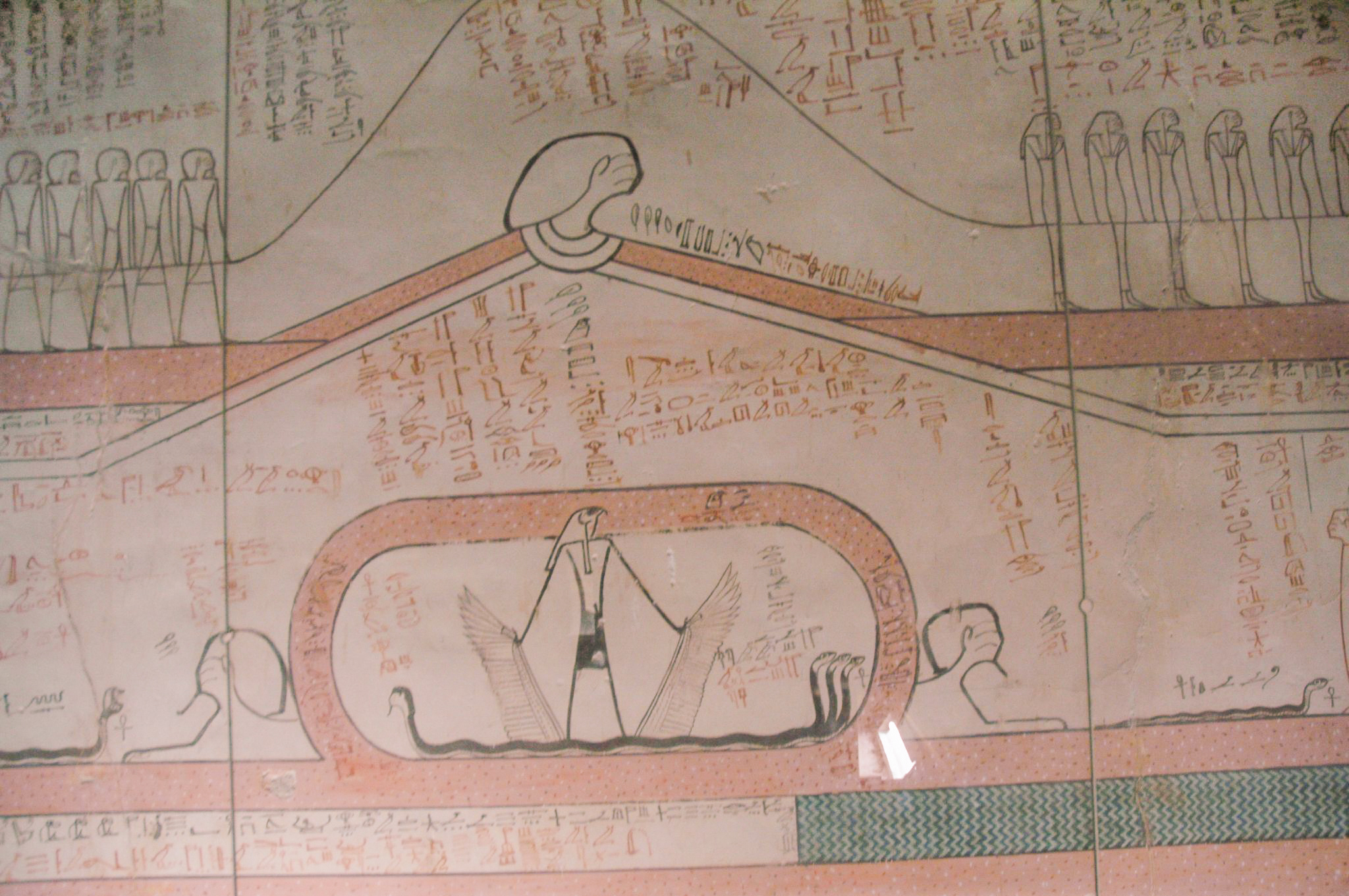

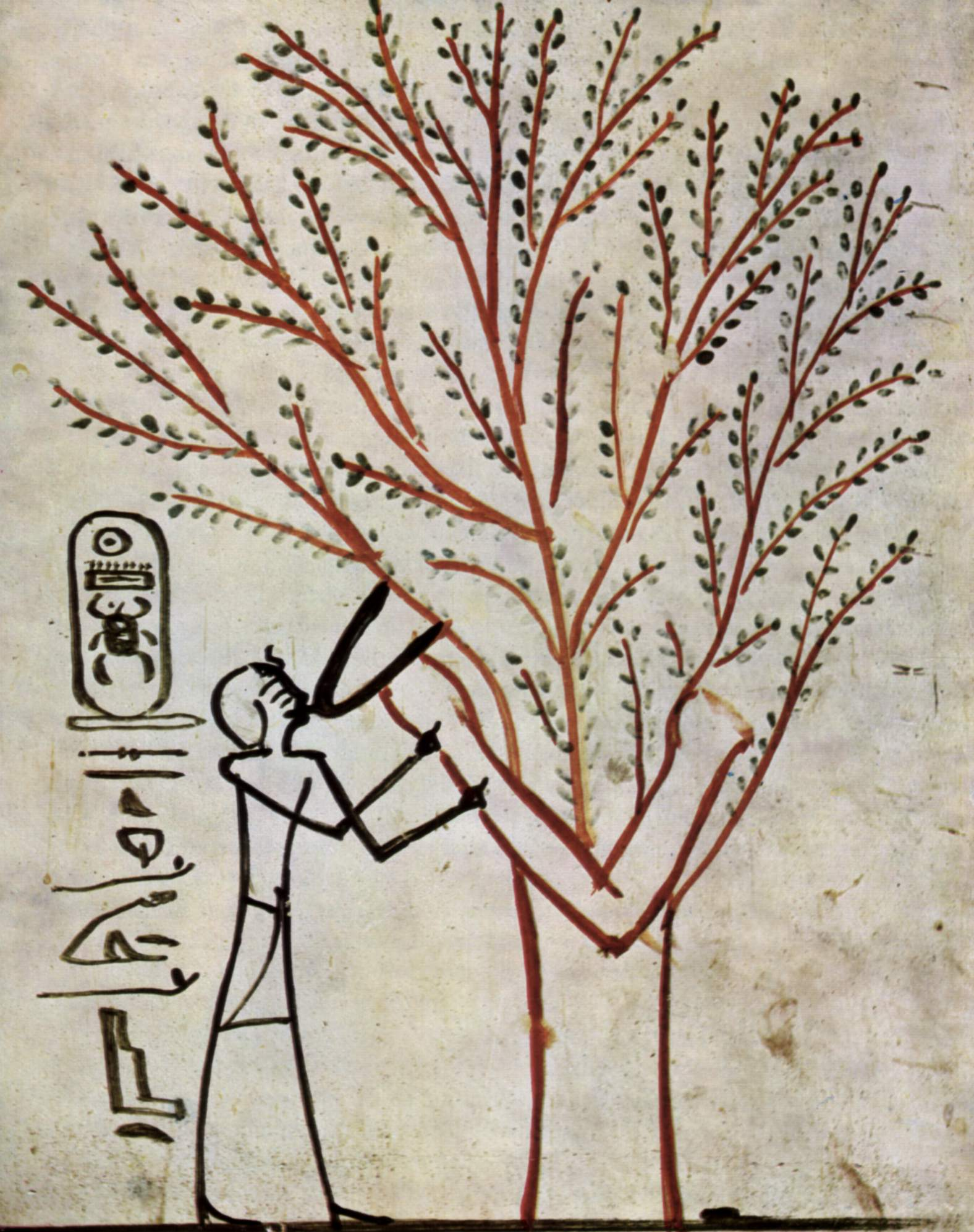

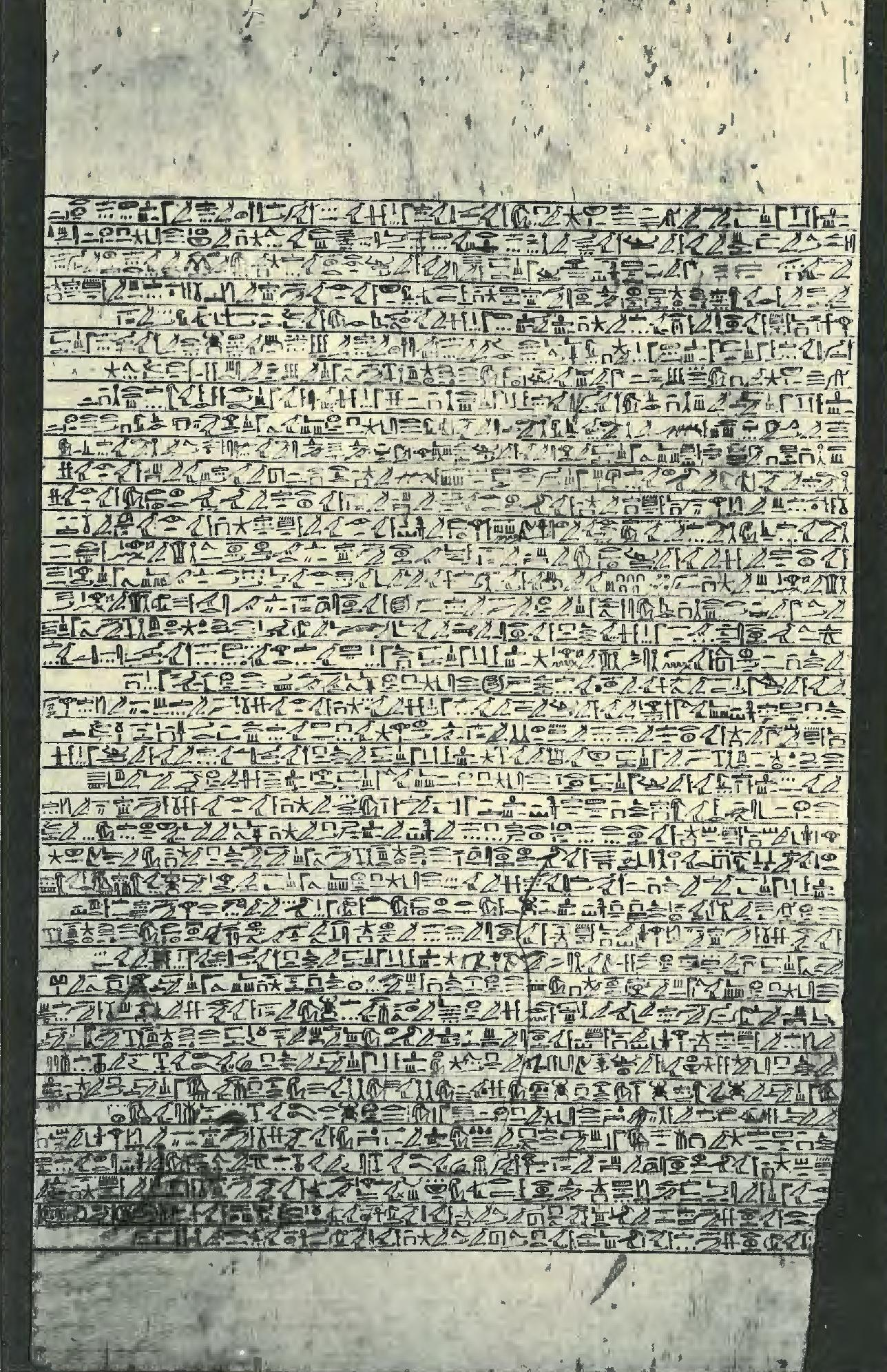
Text from the Short Version of the Amduat

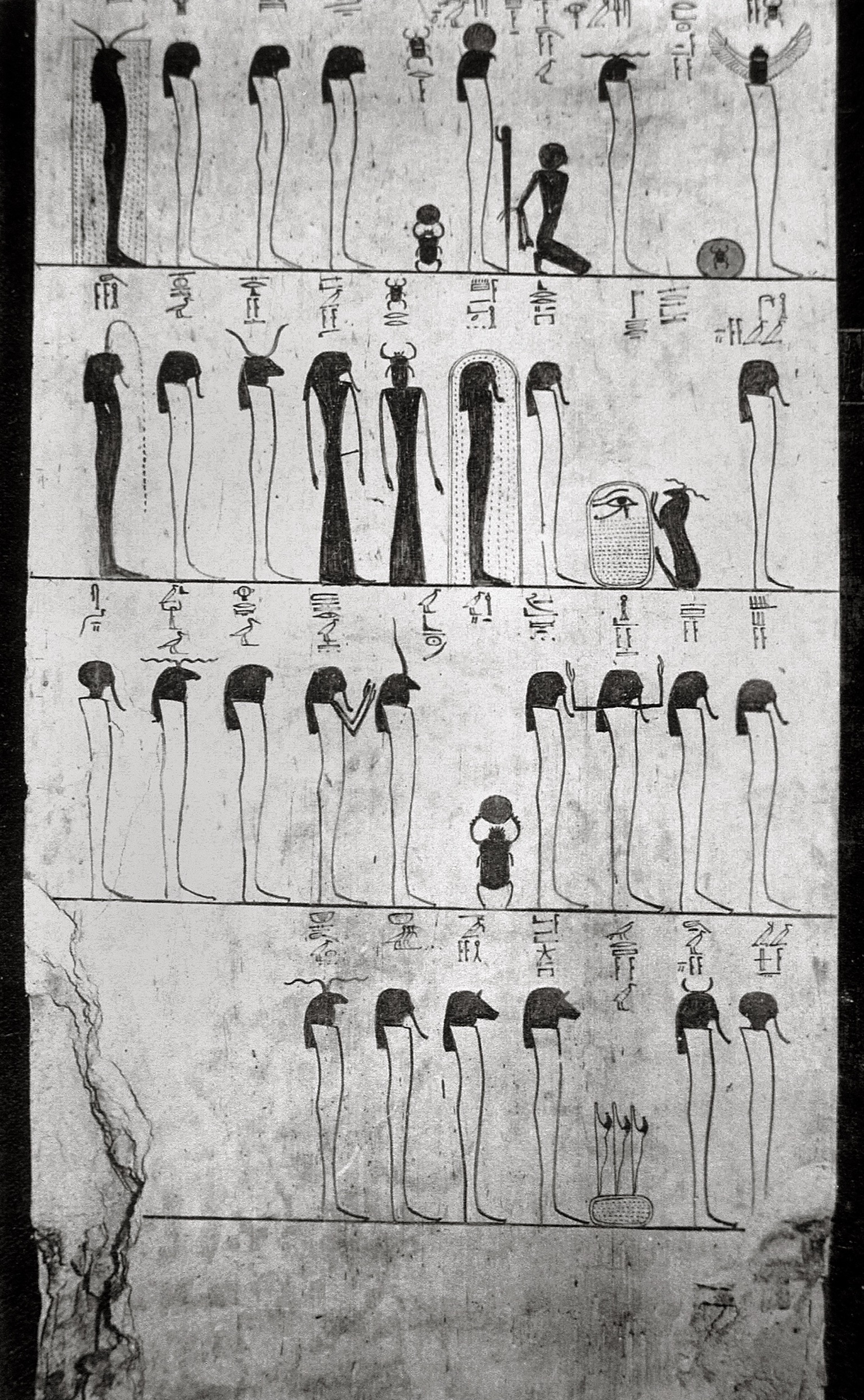
Litany of Re

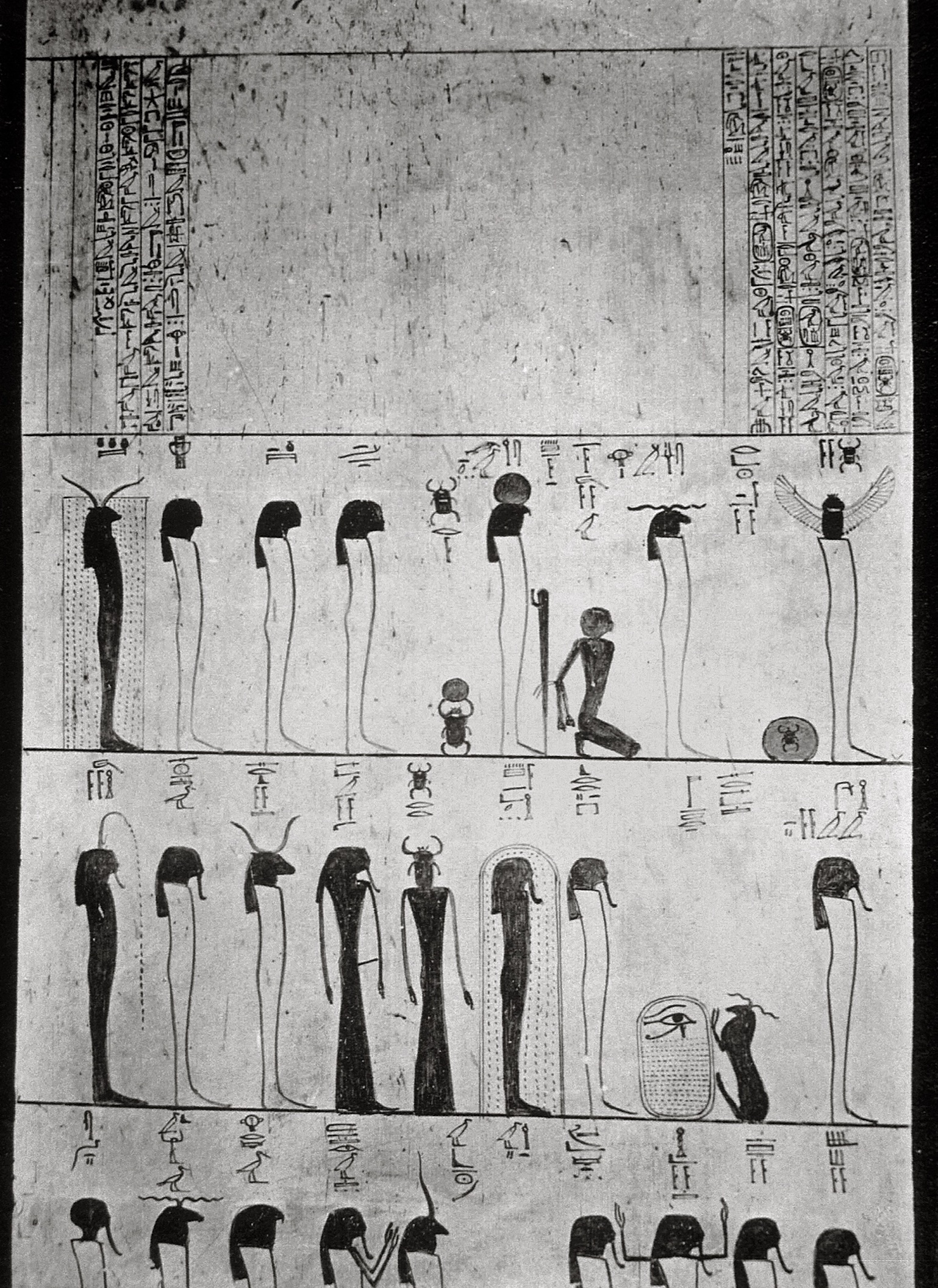

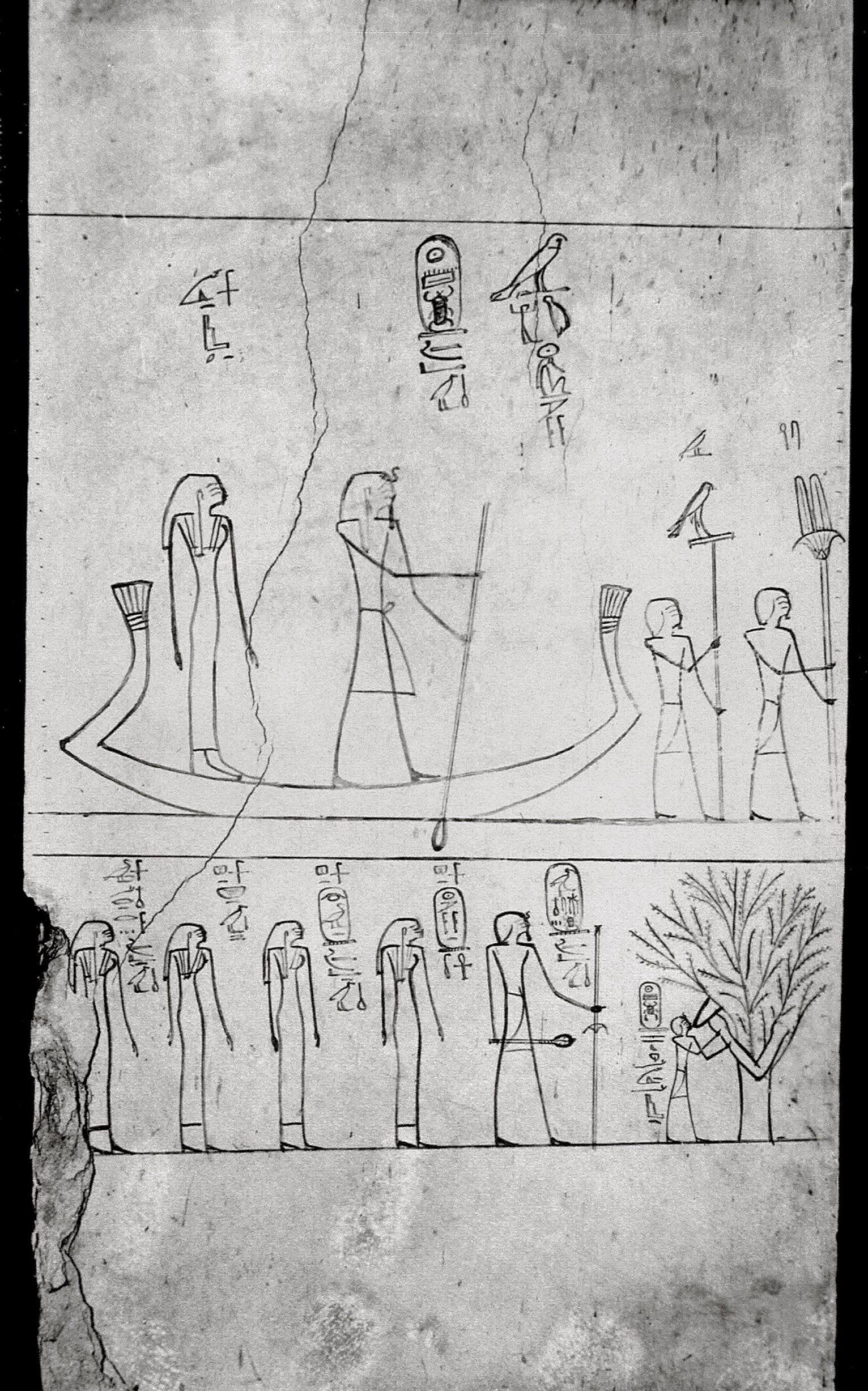
Thutmose III and his family

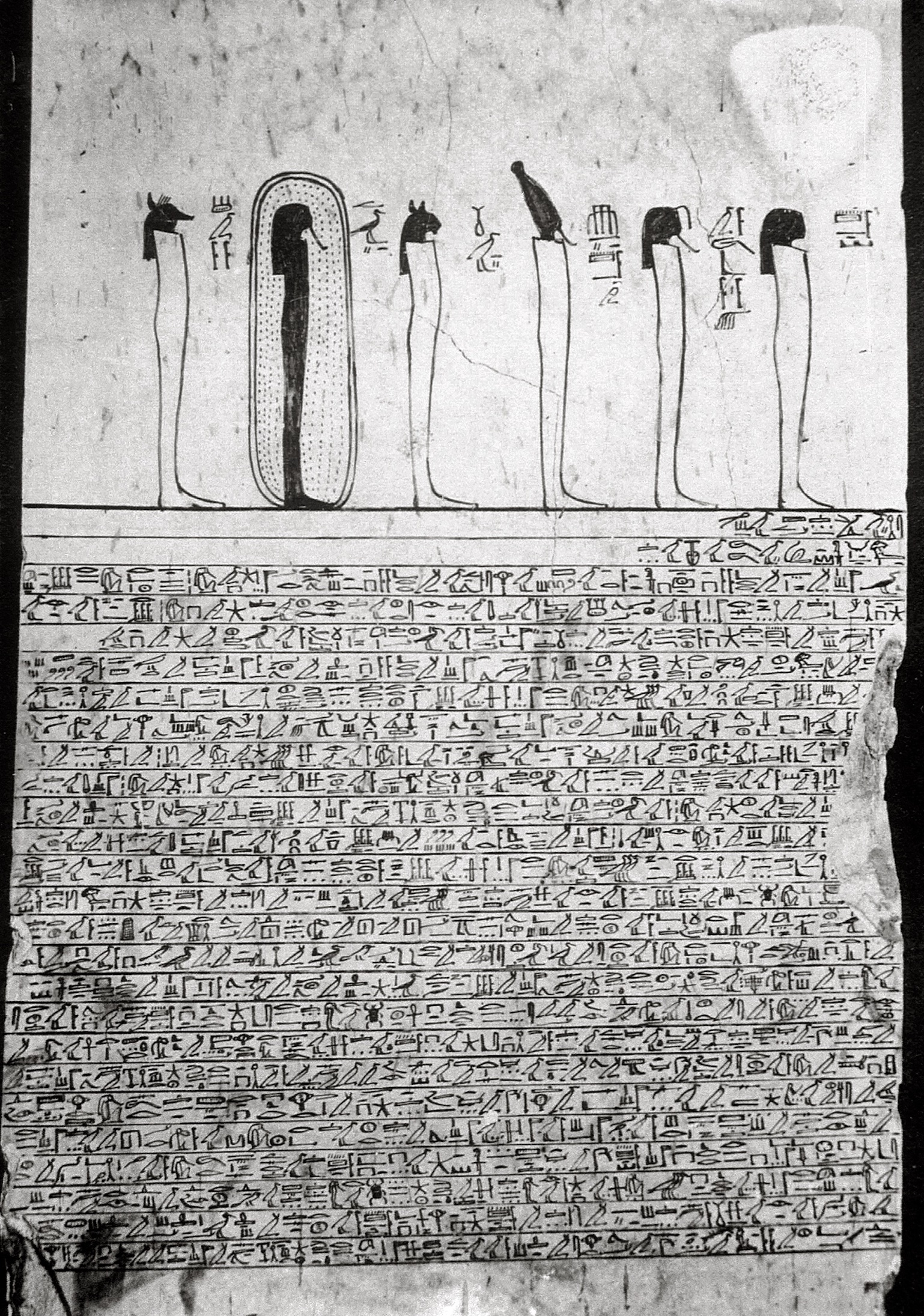
Figures from the Litany to Re, with the beginning of the Short Version of the Amduat below them.

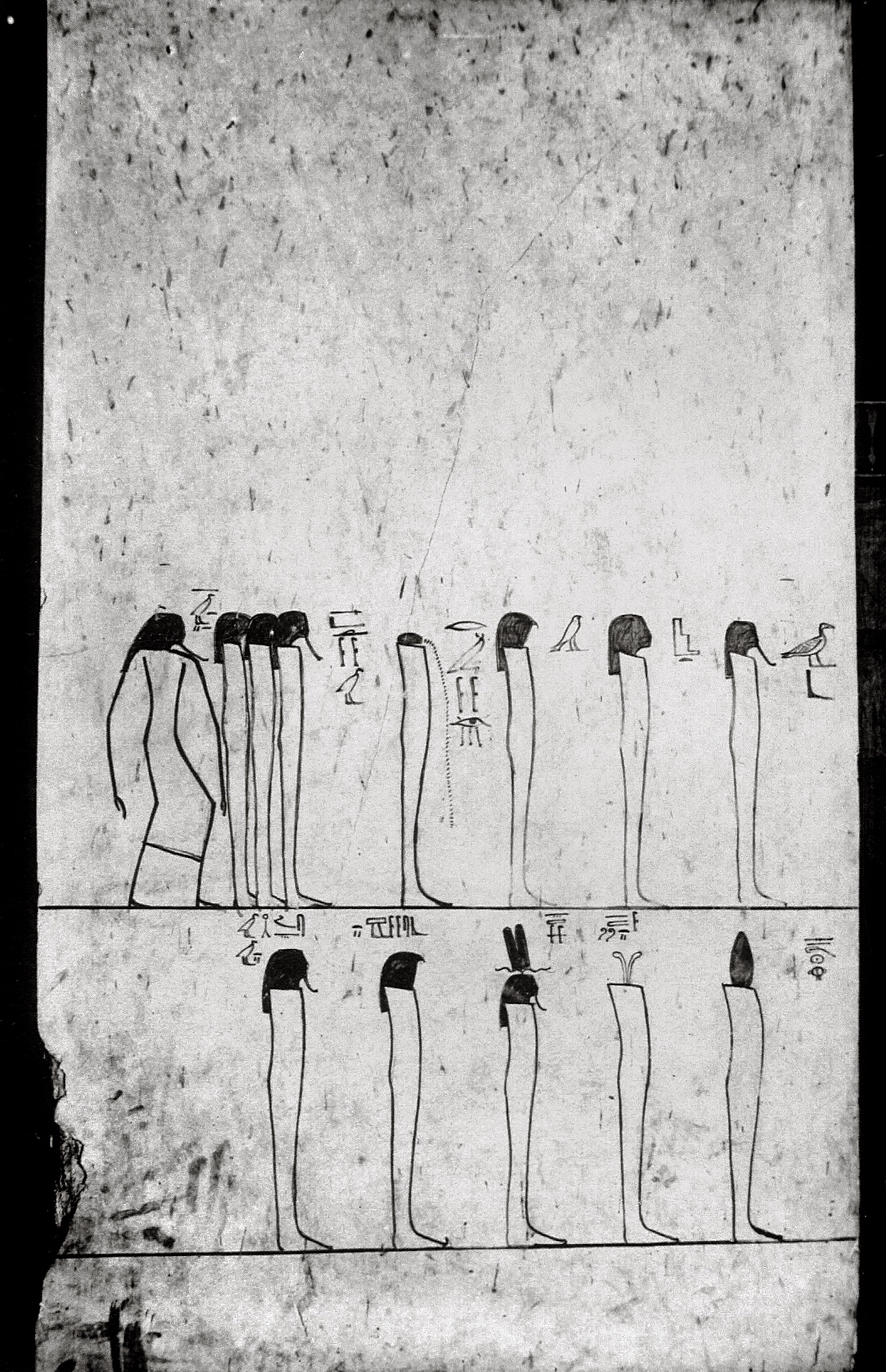

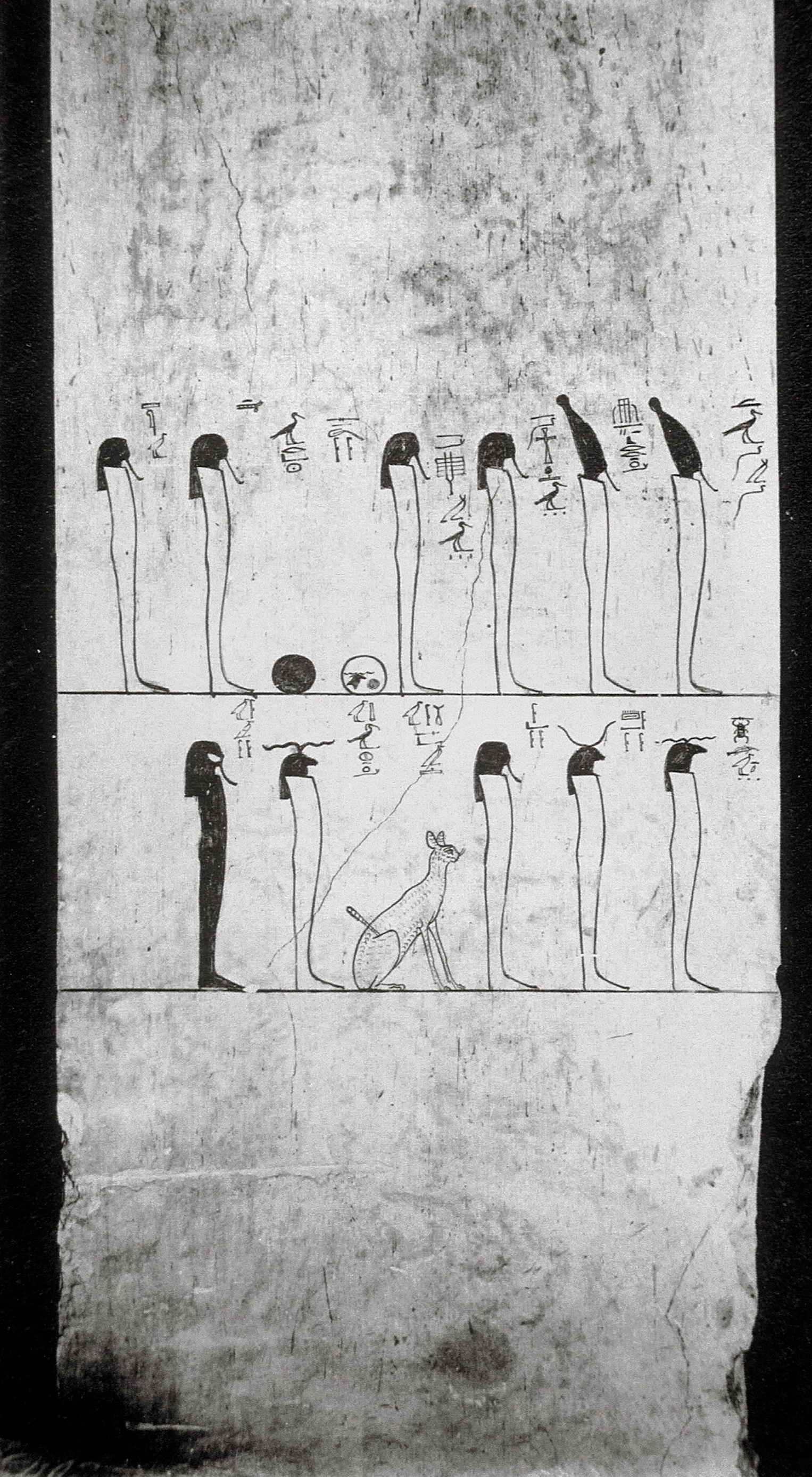

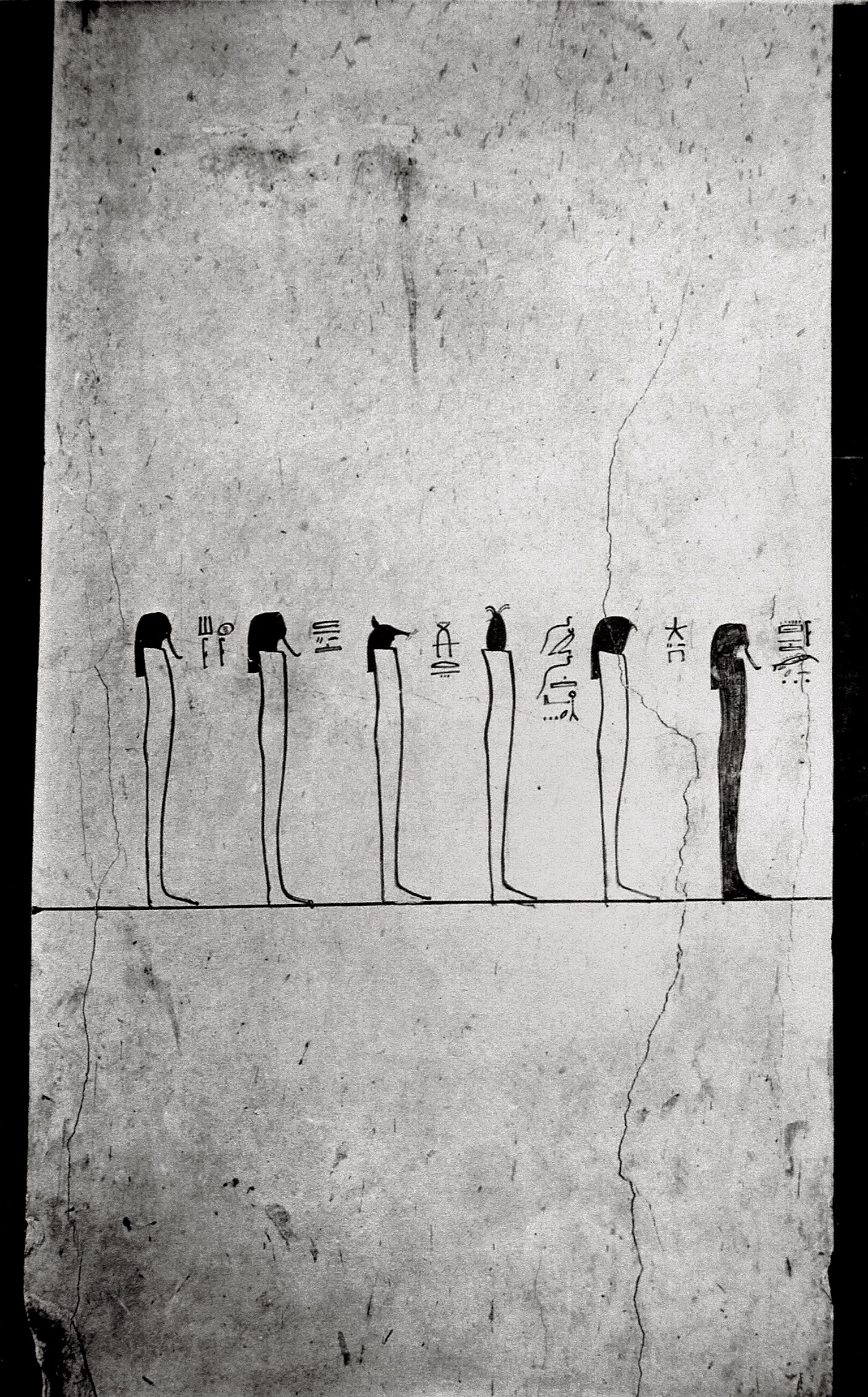
