= WV22 =

Ancient Egyptian tomb in the Valley of the Kings

- Burial site of Amenhotep III
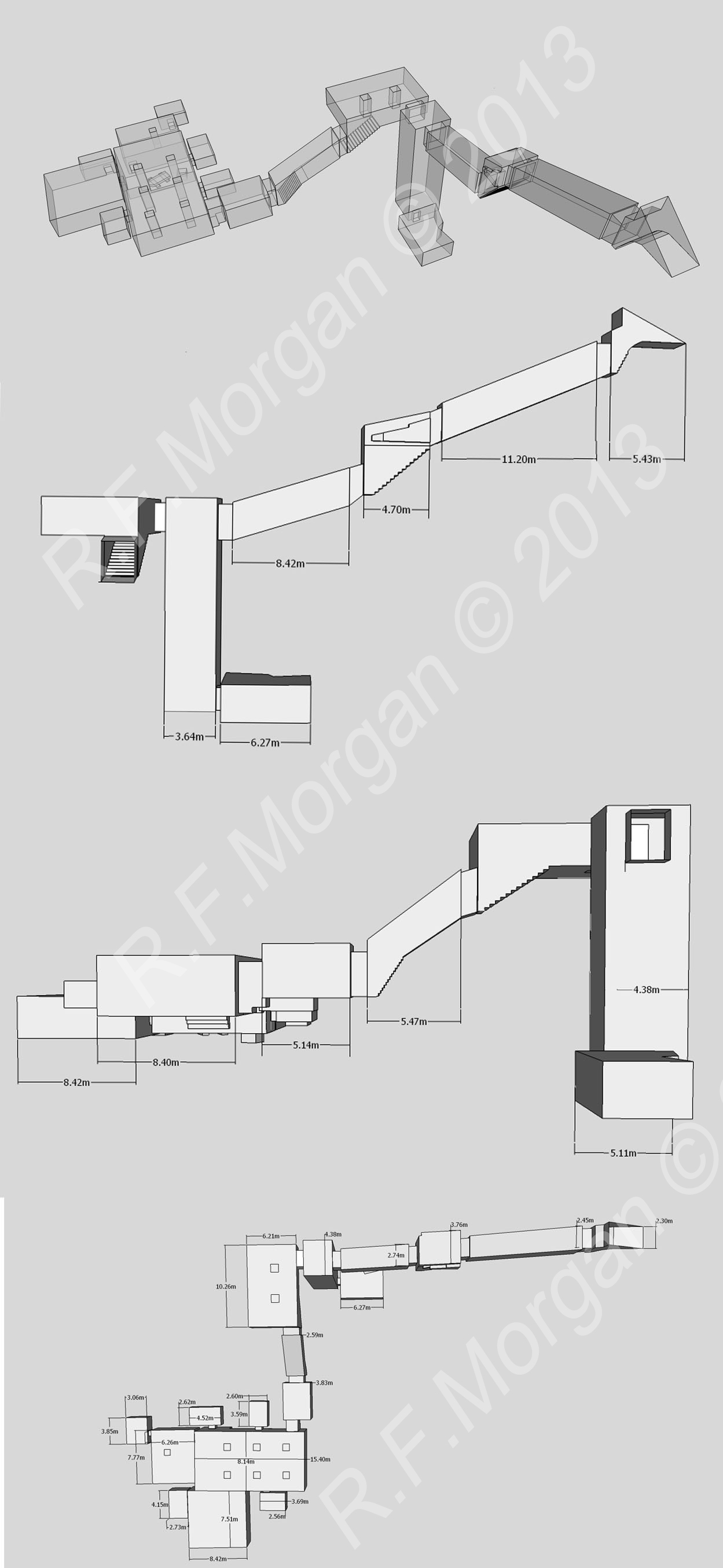
- Schematic of WV22

- Location within Egypt
- Coordinates: 25°44′36″N 32°35′50″E
- Location: West Valley of the Kings
- Discovered: before 1799
- Excavated by: Theodore M. Davis; Howard Carter (1915); Waseda University (1989–present)
- Decoration: Amduat
- Layout: Bent-axis
- ← Previous; KV21 Next → WV23

Tomb WV22, also known as KV22, was the burial place of Amenhotep III, a pharaoh of the Eighteenth Dynasty, in the western arm of the Valley of the Kings. The tomb is unique in that it has two subsidiary burial chambers for the pharaoh's wives Tiye and Sitamen (who was also his daughter). It was officially discovered in August 1799 by Prosper Jollois and Édouard de Villiers du Terrage, engineers with Napoleon's expedition to Egypt but had probably been open for some time. The tomb was first excavated in the early 1900s by Theodore M. Davis; the details of this are lost. The first documented clearance was carried out by Howard Carter in 1915. Since 1989, a Japanese team from Waseda University led by Sakuji Yoshimura and Jiro Kondo has excavated and conserved the tomb. The sarcophagus trough is missing from the tomb, but the lid was reconstructed from shattered fragments. The tomb's layout and decoration follow the tombs of the king's predecessors, Amenhotep II (KV35) and Thutmose IV (KV43); however, the decoration is much finer in quality. Several images of the pharaoh's head were cut out in 1828 and can be seen today in the Louvre. The tomb was opened to visitors on October 4, 2025, having previously been closed for restoration.

== Location and discovery ==
The tomb is situated in a bay on the east side of the wadi, 2 kilometres (1.2 mi) from the entrance to the Western Valley. Unlike earlier tombs, it is not cut into the solid rock at the cliff base but in the talus slope away from it. 60 metres (200 ft) south of the tomb is WVA which, based on jar sealings and the types of pottery found there, likely functioned as a storeroom for overflow from WV22.

The tomb was first noted in August 1799 by Édouard de Villiers du Terrage and Prosper Jollois, engineers in Napoleon's expedition; it is possible it was known to the traveler William George Browne several years earlier. They mapped the tomb and made drawings of some of the artefacts (ushabti) found which were published in Description de l'Egypte. The tomb was visited in 1804 by a John Gordon who carved his name at the entrance. Jean-François Champollion and L'Hôte visited in 1828 as part of the Franco-Tuscan Expedition of 1828–1829, leaving graffiti to that effect in chamber I; Champollion was the first to identify the owner of the tomb as Amenhotep III. Karl Richard Lepsius visited in 1849 and copied parts of the Amduat in the burial chamber. The tomb was visited by countless tourists during the nineteenth century, many of whom carried off souvenirs of their visit; at some point between 1828 and 1829, several portraits of the king were cut from the walls by the Franco-Tuscan Expedition and are now in the Louvre.

== Architecture ==
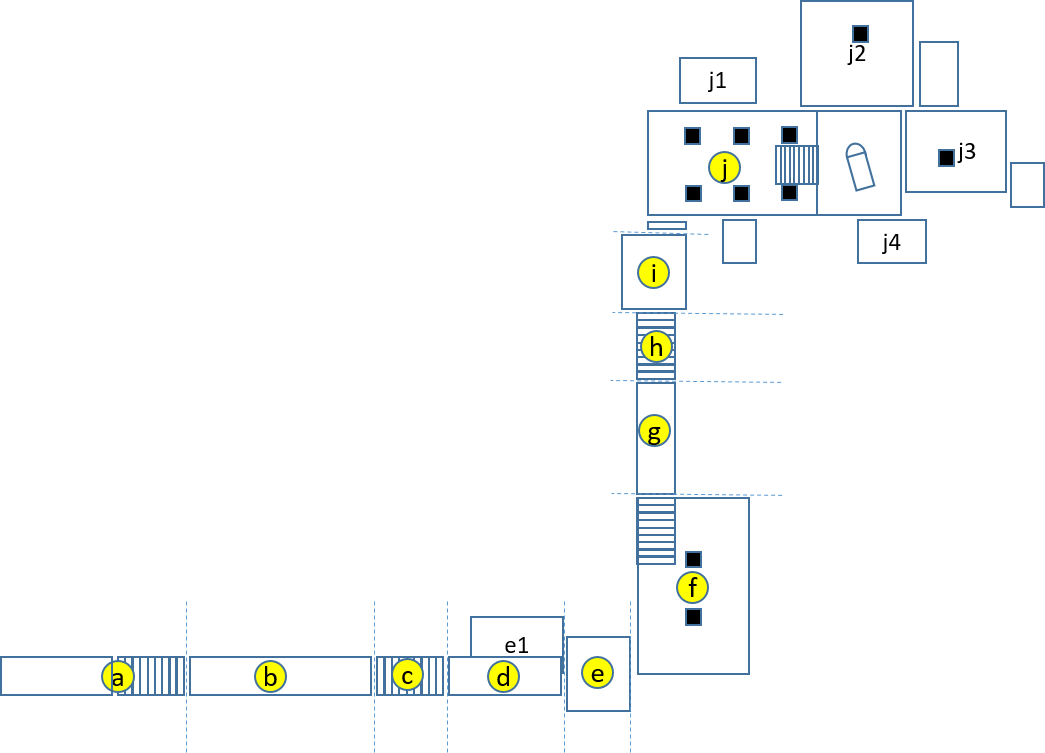
Layout of WV22 a – entrance b – corridor c – steps d – corridor e – well shaft e1 – well chamber f – pillared hall g – corridor h – stairs i – antechamber j – burial chamber j1 – side chamber j2 – queen's suite (Sitamun) j3 – queen's suite (Tiye) j4 – side chamber

The tomb is 85 metres (279 ft) long and generally follows the same layout as KV43, the tomb of Amenhotep's father Thutmose IV, although it does exhibit some changes to this basic design.

The layout consists of two descending corridors separated by stairs, leading to a well chamber, the shaft of which is 7.5 metres (25 ft) deep. A well chamber opens to the west from the base of the shaft. The room seems to have been expanded to the west as the chisel marks in this section are different to those elsewhere in the chamber. On the other side of the well chamber a pillared hall leads to another descending passageway and stair. Uniquely there is no doorway separating these elements. The passage was likely planned to be the same scale as its equivalent in KV43 but was altered during construction. This made the angle of the steps steep, resulting in chiseling above the doorway to the antechamber, likely to allow passage of the sarcophagus.

The square antechamber leads onto the pillared burial chamber with sarcophagus emplacement; a rectangular pit, likely for the king's canopic equipment, is present at the southern end of the chamber. There are three small side rooms leading off the burial chamber and two larger chambers with a single pillar; each has an additional side chamber. One of these suites seems to have always been intended for the burial of a queen, while the other seems to have been a fourth side chamber and only enlarged after the fact, based on chisel marks and the position of the magical niches. The expansion is presumably due to Sitamun's elevation to Great Royal Wife late in Amenhotep III's reign. This situation is paralleled at Malkata, where Sitamun's rooms were squeezed in between those of her parents.

The burial chamber itself has eleven magical niches, five of which are cut into the walls and columns surrounding the sarcophagus emplacement. Two of the niches were found with half of a wood panel that originally sealed them still in place. They would have contained protective figures similar to those discovered in the tomb of Tutankhamun.

== Excavations ==
The first excavation of the tomb was carried out on behalf of Theodore M. Davis sometime between 1905 and 1914 but the details of this clearance are unknown.

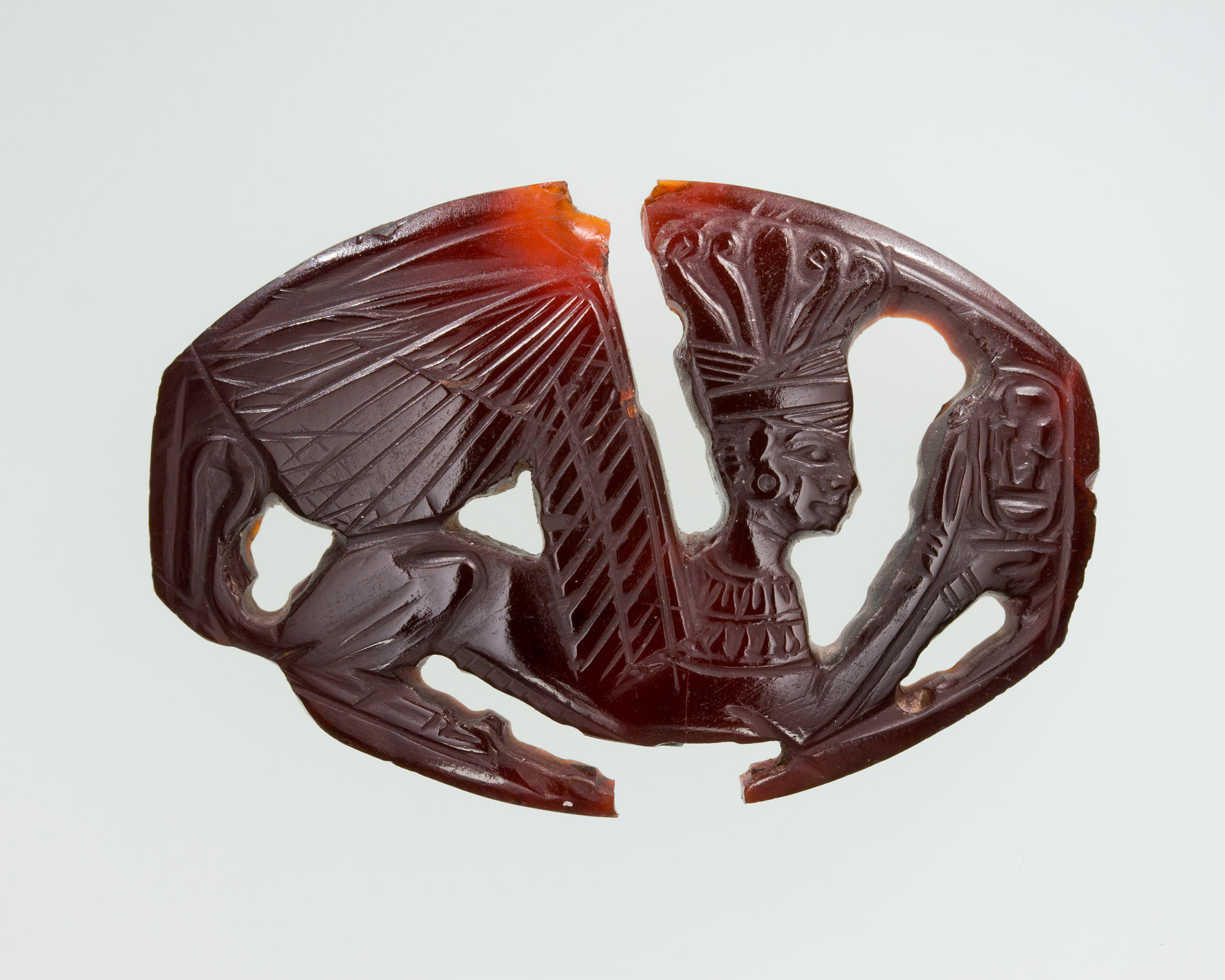
Carved plaque depicting a winged sphinx holding the prenomen of Amenhotep III

Howard Carter investigated the tomb on behalf of Lord Carnarvon between 8 February and 8 March 1915. Carter's interest in the tomb stemmed from his purchase of three bracelet plaques bearing the names of Amenhotep III and Tiye on the antiquities market in 1912, possible strays from Davis' excavation. Digging began in the water course below the tomb, yielding fragments of faience, glass, and the foot of an ushabti inscribed for Tiye. Outside the entrance, Carter found five intact foundation deposits placed into holes cut into the rock, two on each side and one in the centre. These contained calf heads (skulls remaining) placed on top of groups of miniature vessels of pottery and alabaster containing food remains, model tools such as chisels and adzes, and blue faience plaques bearing the names of Amenhotep III's father Thutmose IV, indicating that construction was initiated for this king.

Inside the tomb, work focused on areas Davis had not investigated, namely the fill in the deep protective well shaft and the well chamber at its base. Carter's finds from the well shaft included the hub of a wooden chariot wheel, a faience bracelet plaque, and fragments of Third Intermediate Period coffins. He also investigated the burial chamber, where fragments of the king's calcite canopic chest were found.

=== Re-clearance ===
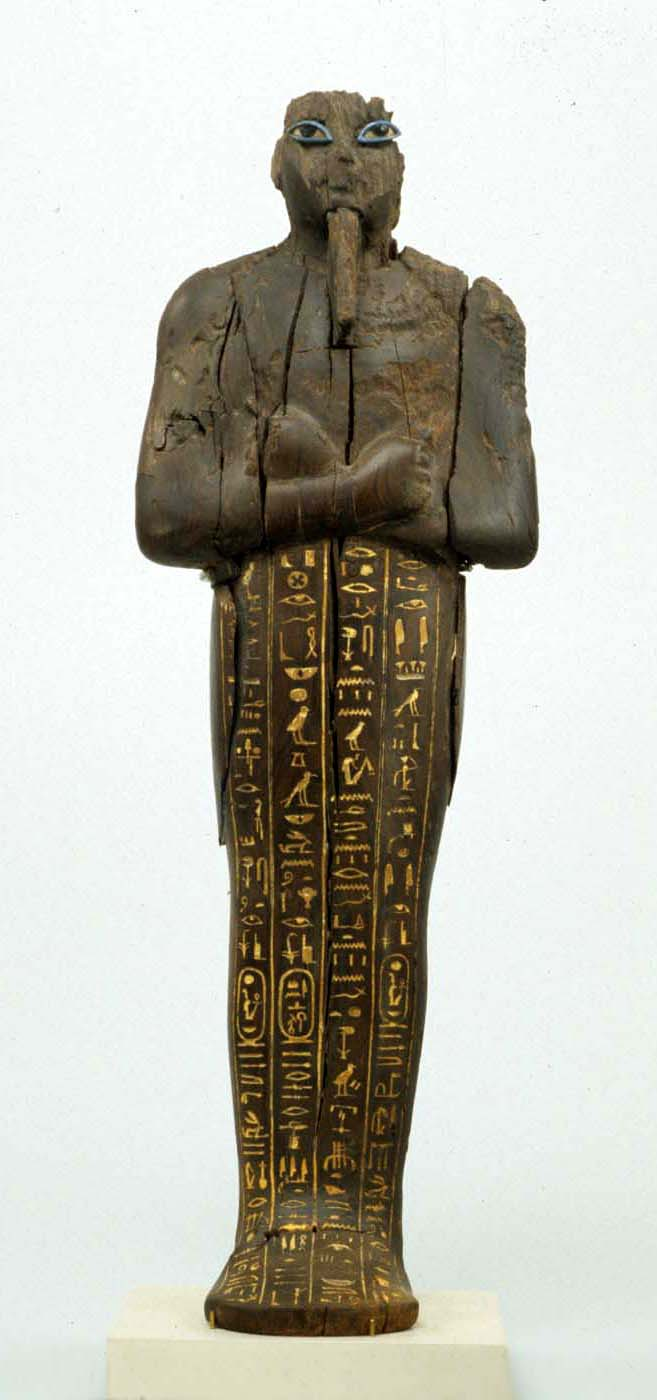
Wooden ushabti of Amenhotep III in the Metropolitan Museum of Art

In September 1989 the Waseda University Egypt Archaeological Mission began a re-clearance to create a precise plan and elevation of the tomb. Looking for traces of Carter's work, excavation was conducted outside the entrance. Carter's spoil heap was located and re-investigation uncovered many small items including pieces of a lotus-shaped collar terminal from the same artefact as fragments in Highclere Castle recovered by Carter from the well shaft, fragmentary jar labels, wooden labels, and a wooden uraeus body from a statue.

While the location of the foundation deposits could not be confirmed, another foundation deposit was uncovered outside the entrance. Unlike those uncovered previously, it was not in a hole cut into the rock but seemed to have been placed on the surface. It contained small pottery vessels, a carved wooden knot, and a wooden rocker which were all placed in a rush basket; a calf head (now rotted away to a skull) was placed on top. Inside the tomb, evidence of previous excavations was encountered: stone blocks were found stacked at the base of the well shaft and the well chamber only contained stacked debris from Carter's excavation.

The antechamber was found to be relatively clear with only 50 centimetres (20 in) of fill; it contained small fragments of pottery and painted plaster. The enlarged side chamber for Sitamun contained another large spoil heap hemmed in by a stone wall, likely from Davis' excavation. Careful sieving yielded pieces of painted plaster from the walls and ceiling, fragmentary pottery and stone vessels, and wooden objects. Fill from the clearance of the burial chamber and side rooms was also moved into this chamber. Finds included two yellow faience faces from ushabti, lapis lazuli inlays and amulets, a lapis uraeus head with inlaid eyes set in gold surrounds; and pieces of wooden and stone ushabti for Amenhotep III.

== Contents ==
Following his death in Year 38 or 39 of his reign, Amenhotep III was interred with a range of burial goods similar to those of Tutankhamun. The king was likely buried inside nested wooden coffins with inlaid rishi (feather) decoration and possibly fitted with a gold mask; such a coffin or mask the suggested source of the lapis uraeus head found by the Japanese team. The coffins and mummy were buried within a large cartouche-shaped sarcophagus made of granite instead of the usual quartzite, the first use of this stone for a royal burial in the Eighteenth Dynasty. Only the lid remains, some 3 metres (9.8 ft) long, now broken into two main pieces. The lid is inscribed with a central vertical band of text and eight horizontal bands; the underside is decorated with a winged figure of Nut. The upper surface of the lid was once covered with gold leaf. Wooden fragments suggest the sarcophagus was enclosed in a series of gilded wooden shrines.

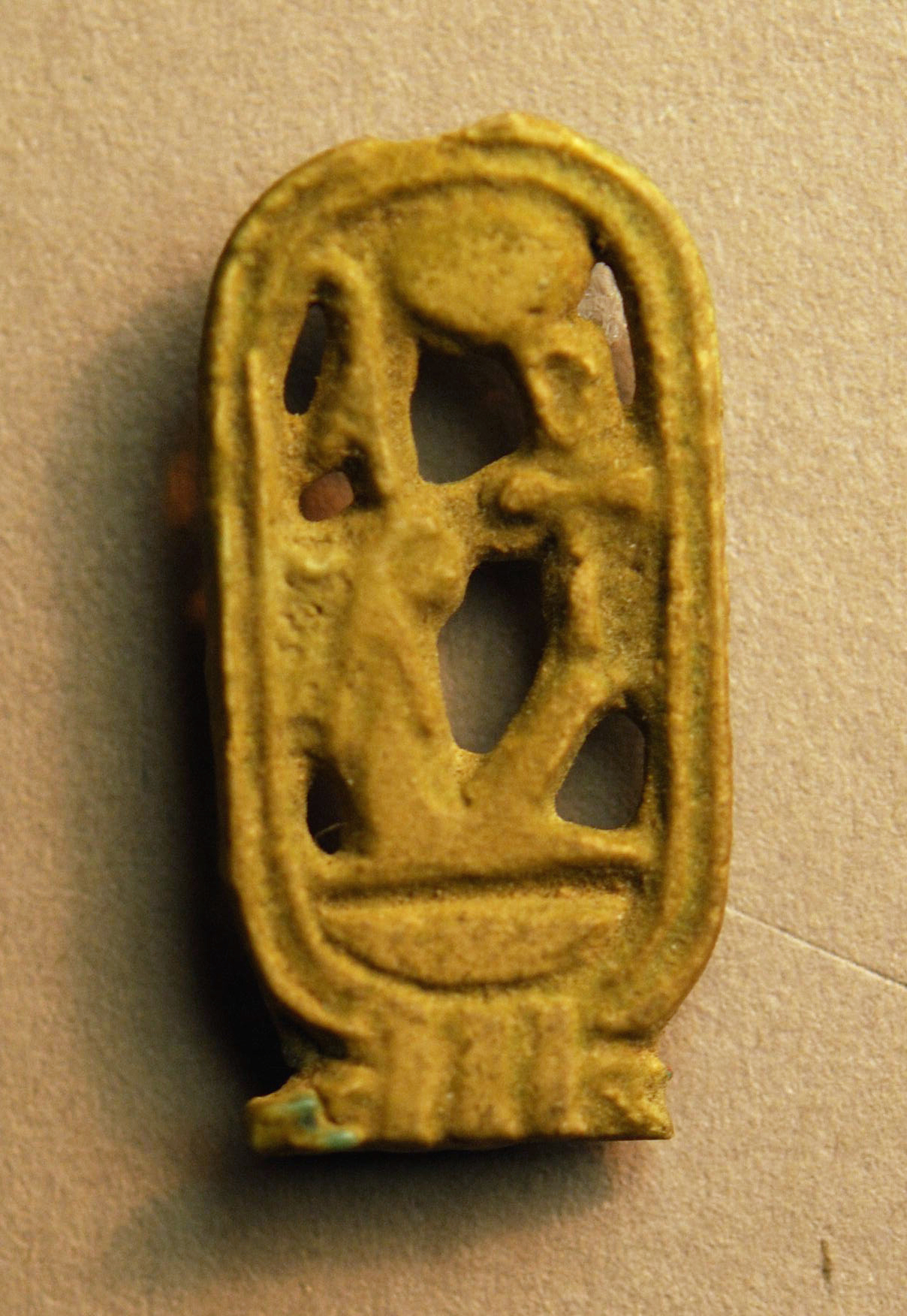
Cartouche of Amenhotep II found in WV22 by the Carnarvon/Carter expedition of 1915

The king's canopic shrine was protected by a gilded shrine with figures of four protective goddesses, as wooden fragments of a head wearing the khat-headdress attest; this head is the same scale as the figures on Tutankhamun's canopic shrine. Fragments of the calcite canopic chest reveal winged goddesses stood astride each corner, and the stoppers took the shape of the king's head wearing a nemes-headdress.

Amenhotep was equipped with over eighty ushabti. Many of the surviving examples are in stones such as serpentine, calcite, granodiorite, and large examples in red granite. Wooden ushabti are the most numerous of the surviving ushabti. They are made of imported woods such as ebony and cedar, and featured inlaid eyes and crowns or wigs, and pigment-filled inscriptions.

Despite preparations for the burials of Tiye and Sitamun, it is doubtful that they were ever buried in the suites intended for them. Both apparently outlived Amenhotep and were buried elsewhere, as placing them within the tomb would have involved dismantling the blocked and painted doorways at the well chamber and antechamber. Nothing is known of Sitamun's burial but Tiye survived well into the reign of her son Akhenaten, and was seemingly buried in the Royal Tomb at Amarna. Carter considered that the presence of ushabti naming Tiye indicated that she was indeed interred in WV22 but the ushabti bear the titles 'Great Royal Wife' and 'Royal Mother,' indicating they were prepared in the reign of Akhenaten. This may lend support to a period of co-regency between Amenhotep III and Amenhotep IV/Akhenaten; alternatively they may be votives. Another theory is that they may indicate Tiye was ultimately reburied in WV22 after the removal of the royal burials from Amarna. The badly damaged mummy of Amenhotep III was moved from the tomb and restored in Year 13 of Smendes, and was ultimately discovered cached in KV35, the tomb of Amenhotep II, together with other Eighteenth Dynasty mummies including Tiye and The Younger Lady.

It is clear from the fragmentary remains found by excavators that the tomb had been thoroughly robbed in antiquity. The gold fittings from the coffins had been stripped and emptied of their inlays, a few of which were found in the tomb, such as a lapis lazuli vulture headdress worn by a queen or goddess. A mass of inlays and gold foil were carried to the main valley and found cached near KV36, the tomb of Maiherpri, by Carter in 1902. The sarcophagus box is missing and no fragments of it were found in the course of the excavation. It was likely removed for reuse during the official emptying of the royal valley in the Third Intermediate Period.

The fragments of intrusive burials found by Carter in the well, also from the Third Intermediate Period, were likely introduced after the king's body and sarcophagus were removed. One coffin belonged to a man named Padihor, while the other belonged to a woman whose name is lost but whose mother was Tabesheribet.

== Decoration ==
The walls and ceilings of the burial chamber, antechamber, and well shaft are all completely decorated; the chamber for Tiye is partly decorated with kheker-friezes. In the well chamber and antechamber the paintings were executed over the blocked and plastered doorways. For the first time the king is accompanied by his ka and seen before Hathor, now differentiated from her role as Mistress of the West, and Nut.

In the well chamber, Amenhotep is accompanied by the ka of his father Thutmose IV, suggested by Betsy Bryan to show that the king considered the foundation of the tomb by his father to be important. Alternatively, Kondo sees this as remnants of decoration indicating the tomb was originally intended for Thutmose.

The burial chamber, is decorated with complete and abridged versions of the Amduat painted on a yellow-tinged background (intended to resemble aged papyrus), with the figures drawn as simple (almost naive) stick figures and text executed in a cursive hieroglyphic book hand used more commonly for sacred texts on papyrus.

Unfortunately, from the time of discovery, the decoration of the tomb has been in poor condition. Lepsius, who visited and copied sections of the Amduat from the walls of the burial chamber, described the tomb as "...covered with beautiful sculptures, though, alas! much mutilated by time and human hands." The paintings are damaged by salt efforescence, and sections of plaster have detached from the underlying rock, especially on the lower portions of walls. Further damage was inflicted to the tomb when portions of decoration were cut out by the Franco-Tuscan Expedition of 1828–1829, followed by countless of tourists taking souvenirs of the walls during the nineteenth century. Today, the heads are now on display in the Louvre. As part of the Waseda excavations, restoration of the remaining paintings was undertaken by a team of Japanese, Egyptian, and Italian experts who had previously worked on the restoration of QV66, the tomb of Nefertari.

Since the 2000s, Zahi Hawass has asked the Louvre to return the faces of WV22 to Egypt, so it can be restored to the tomb.

== Graffito ==
A hieratic inscription (graffito) is located high up on the wall in the door way leading to the antechamber from the final flight of stairs. It reads "Year 3, third month of Akhet, day 7." It appears to be contemporary with the era of the tomb, although it is unclear what exactly it refers to. It may indicate the final closing of the tomb, with the 'Year 3' presumably referring to the reign of his son and successor, Akhenaten, or it may indicate the date that the tomb was inspected for Tiye's reburial, or the date of her reburial. Marianne Eaton-Krauss attributes the graffito to the reign of Smenkhkare, while Marc Gabolde suggests it is contemporary with the graffito of Pawah, dating the reburial to the reign of Neferneferuaten. Nozomu Kawai identifies the reburial as occurring in Year 3 of the reign of Tutankhamun.

== Gallery ==
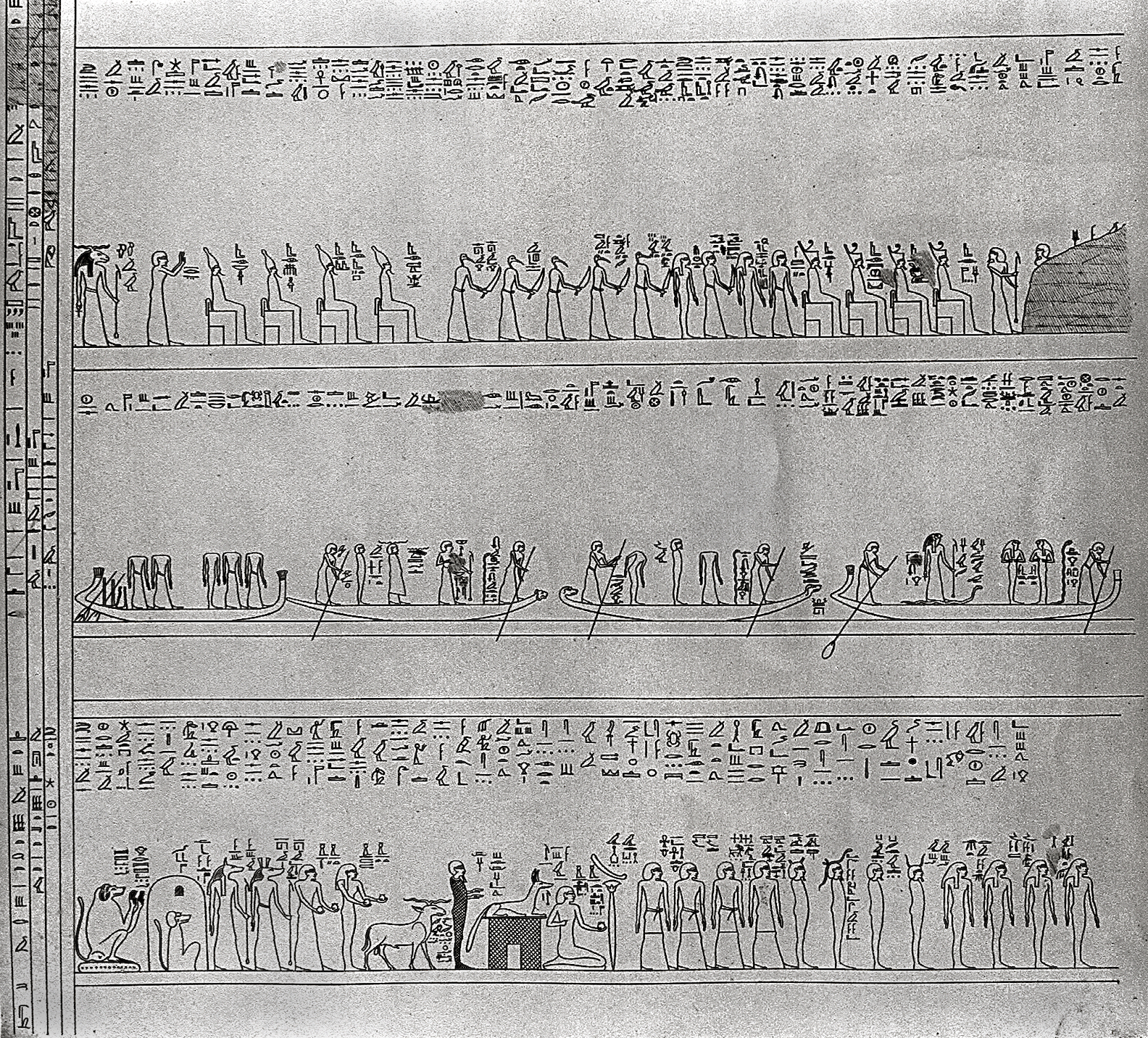
Sketch by Karl Richard Lepsius of one of the walls, depicting a scene from the Amduat

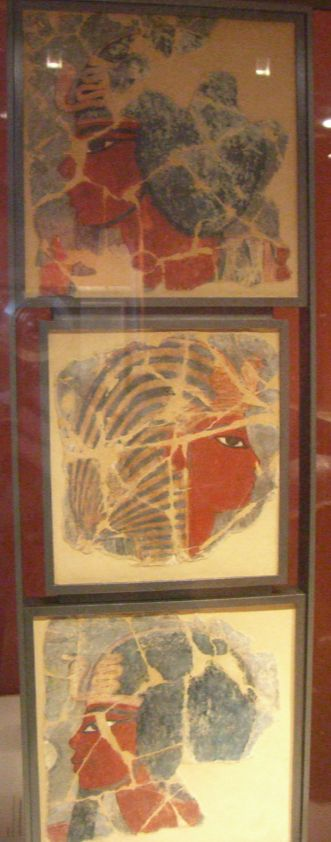
Heads of Amenhotep III cut from the walls in WV22, now in the Louvre
