= Tomb of Amenhotep II =

Tomb of Pharaoh Amenhotep II in Luxor, Egypt

KV35
- Burial site of Amenhotep II
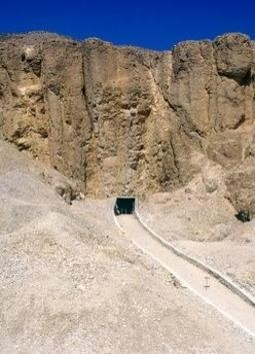
- Entrance to KV35

- Location within Egypt
- Coordinates: 25°44′23.6″N 32°36′0.5″E
- Location: East Valley of the Kings
- Discovered: March 9, 1898
- Excavated by: Victor Loret
- Layout: Bent-axis
- ← Previous; KV34 Next → KV36

The tomb of Amenhotep II, also known by its tomb number, KV35, is the burial place of Amenhotep II, a pharaoh of the Eighteenth Dynasty of Egypt, in the Valley of the Kings in Luxor, Egypt. Later, it was used as a cache for other royal mummies. It was discovered by Victor Loret in March 1898.

== Layout and history ==
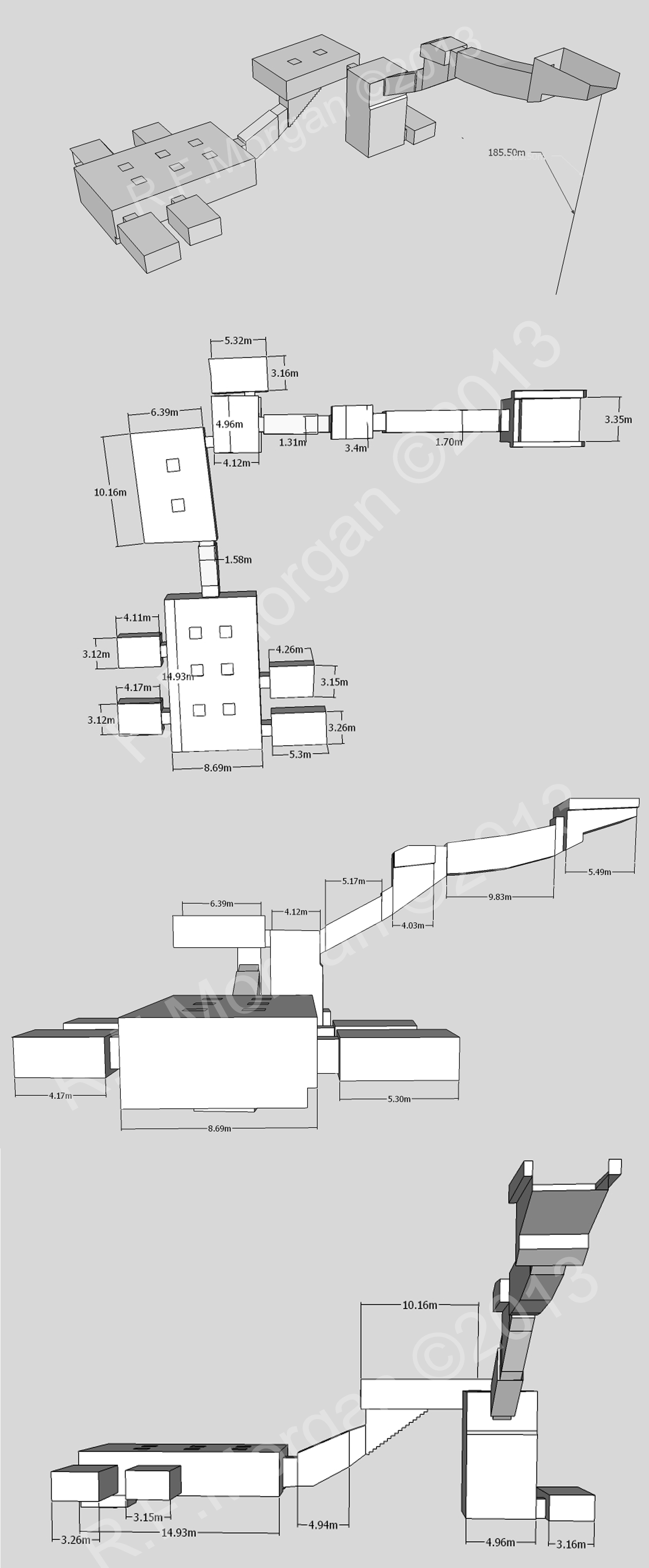
Isometric, plan and elevation images of KV35

It has a bent dog-leg shape axis, typical of the layout of early Eighteenth Dynasty tombs, but several features make this tomb unusual. First, A steep corridor leads down from the entrance past a deep well. The well, intended to throw off potential tomb robbers, was first adapted in the tomb of Amenhotep's father and predecessor, Thutmose III, and would also be incorporated to the tombs of later pharaohs. Passing across the well leads to a rectangle antechamber, and beyond it is the burial chamber.

The burial chamber is rectangular and divided into upper and lower pillared sections, with the lower part holding the cartouche-shaped royal sarcophagus of the king. This style of burial chamber became standard for royal burials in the later New Kingdom. In the burial chamber, there stand four smaller side chambers. One of them was used as the burial of his son Webensenu, who died as a child and was buried with him in the tomb. His canopic jars and shabtis were found in the tomb as well.

Only the burial chamber of the tomb is decorated, albeit in an unusual style that, other than KV34 (the tomb of Amenhotep II's father, Thutmose III), is not found elsewhere in the Valley of the Kings. On a yellow-tinged background (intended to resemble aged papyrus), the Amduat is traced, depicting the ancient Egyptian deities as simple (almost naive) stick figures, with text written in the cursive hieroglyphic book hand used more commonly for sacred texts on papyrus.

Later the tomb was used as a mummy cache. Mummies belonging to the following individuals were relocated here during the Third Intermediate Period and were identified by inscriptions on their burial wrappings:

- Amenhotep II (the original tomb owner found in his original sarcophagus)

Side Chamber:

- Thutmose IV
- Amenhotep III
- Merneptah
- Seti II
- Siptah
- Ramesses IV
- Ramesses V
- Ramesses VI
- Queen Tiye, who was identified as the so-called Elder Lady in February 2010 via DNA testing.
- A prince, identified by some as Webensenu, son of Amenhotep II, whose canopic jars were found in the tomb, or Thutmose, the elder son of Amenhotep III and Tiye
- The Younger Lady who, in June 2003, was controversially claimed to be Nefertiti by British Egyptologist Joann Fletcher, whereas Egyptologist Zahi Hawass believed it to be Kiya, another wife of Akhenaten who is thought by some to be the birth mother of Tutankhamun. Some believed this mummy to be a male. However, with DNA testing, this mummy was shown in February 2010 to be a woman, the mother of Tutankhamun, and the daughter of Amenhotep III and Tiye (making her both the sister and wife of Akhenaten). Her name, however, remains unknown, leaving open the possibility that she is likely either Nebetiah or Beketaten.
- An "unknown woman D" in an upturned lid of a coffin inscribed for Setnakhte (may be queen Tawosret).
- A body on a boat that was later stolen or destroyed at the start of the twentieth century (may be Setnakhte).
- Two skulls were found in the well and an anonymous arm was found with the above "Younger Lady."

All the kings' mummies discovered in KV35, and the "Elder Lady" (labelled as Queen Tiye), are on display at the Royal Mummies Gallery of the National Museum of Egyptian Civilization in Cairo, having been moved there in 2021 during the Pharaohs' Golden Parade.

== Gallery ==
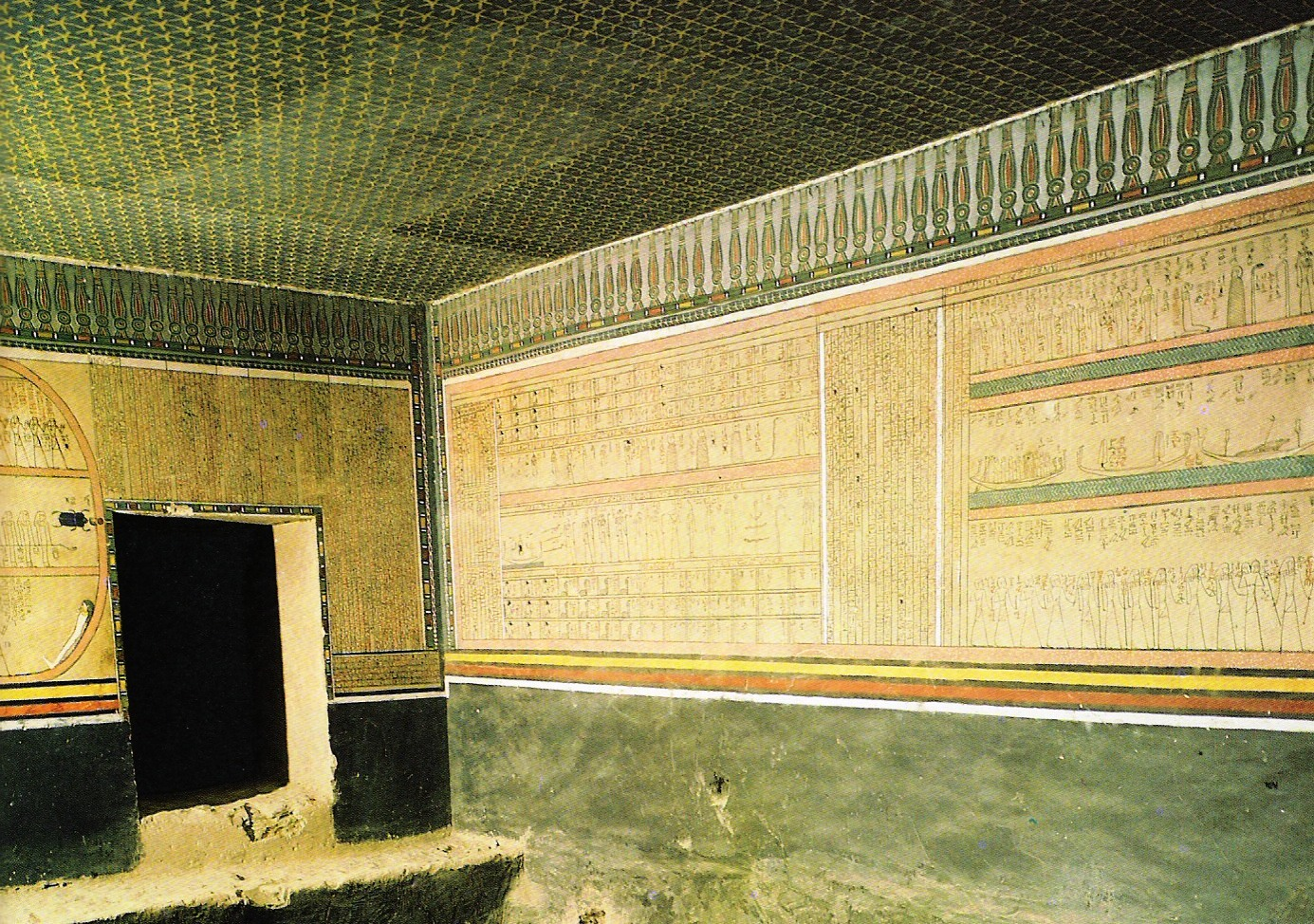

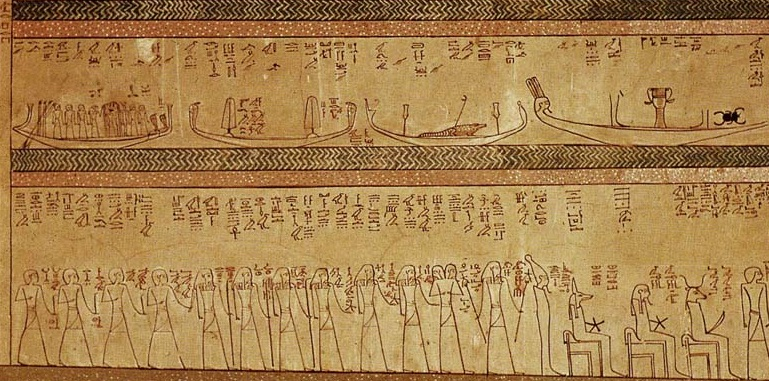
Second hour of the Amduat

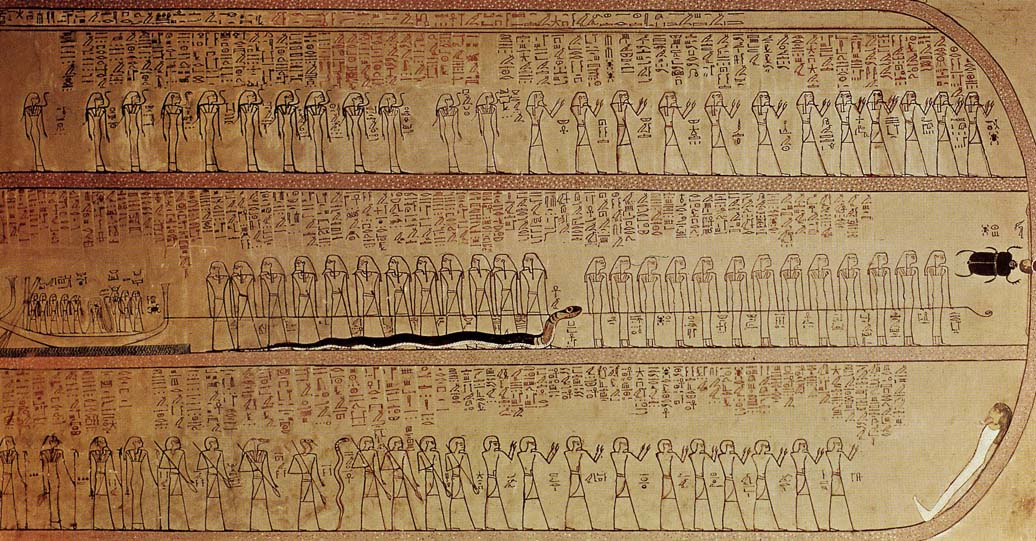
Twelfth hour of the Amduat

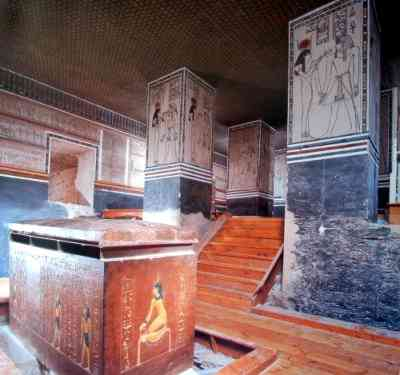

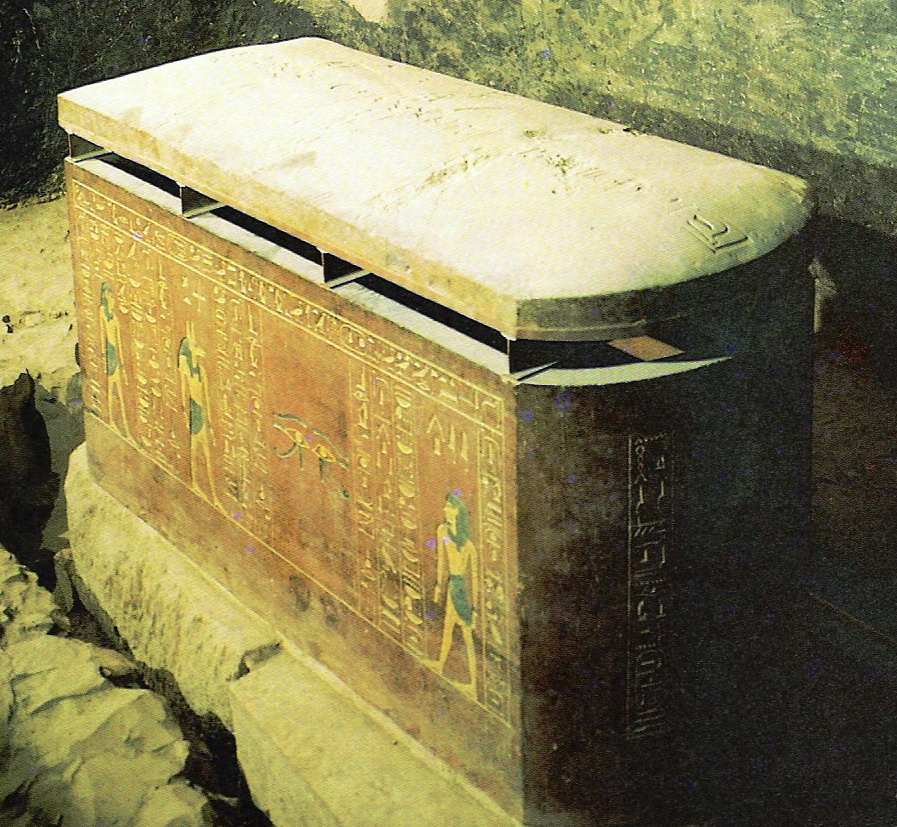

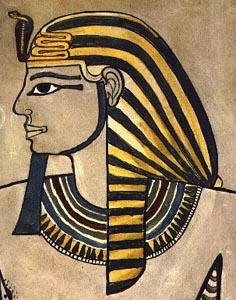

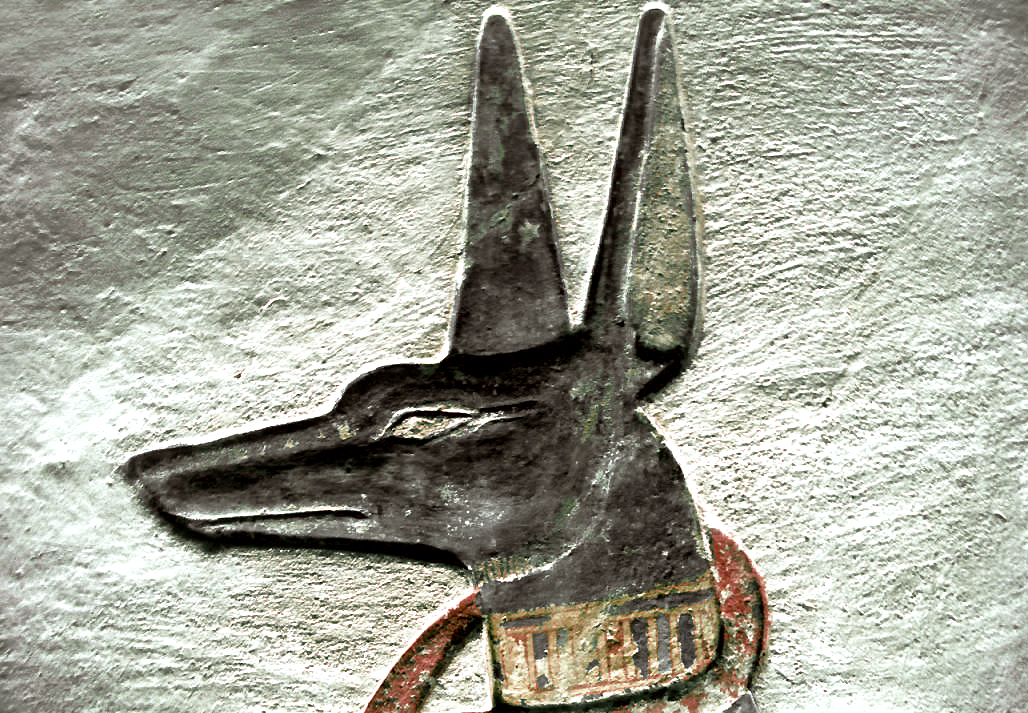

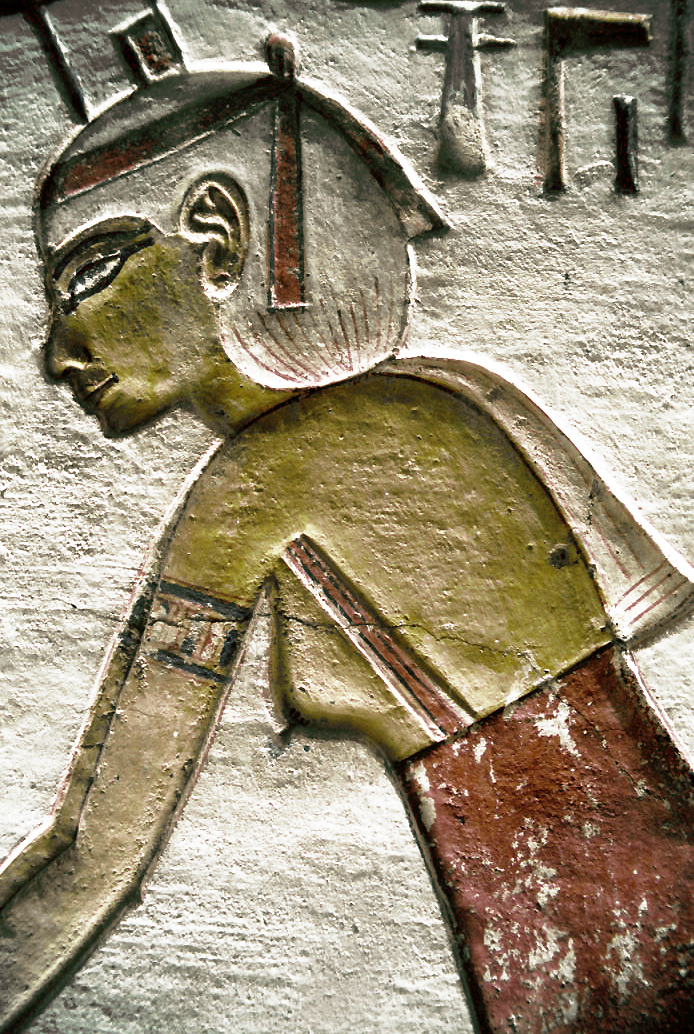

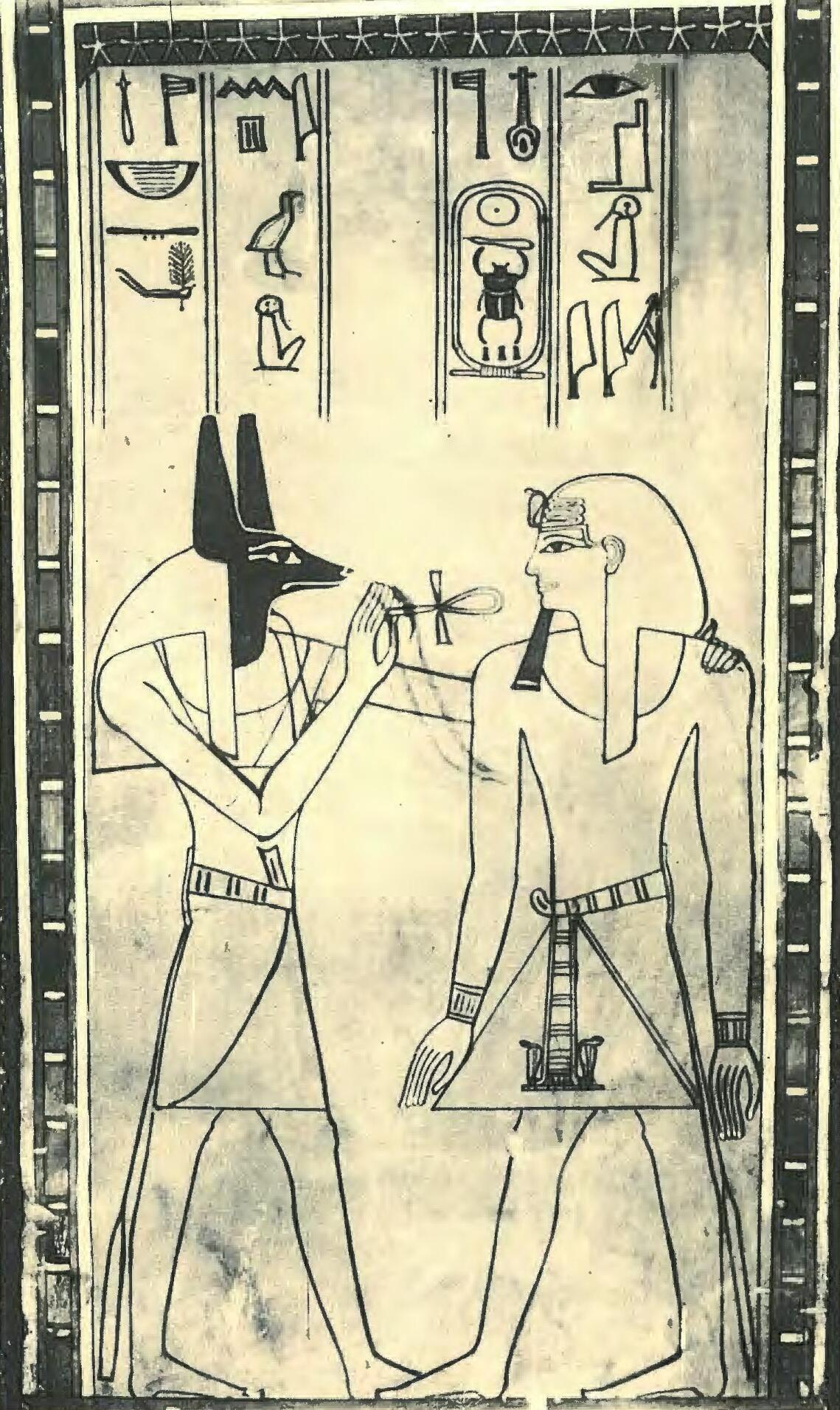

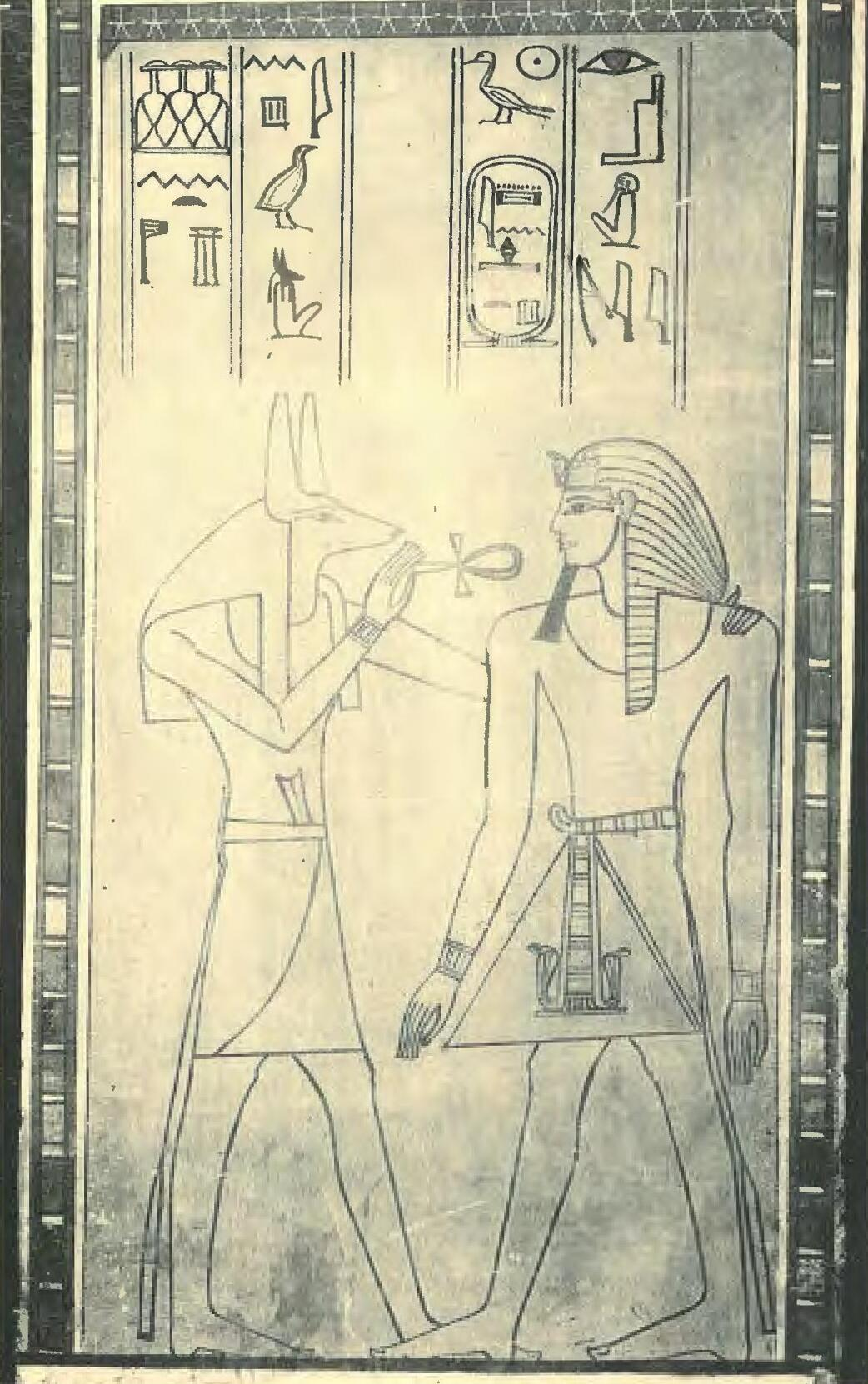

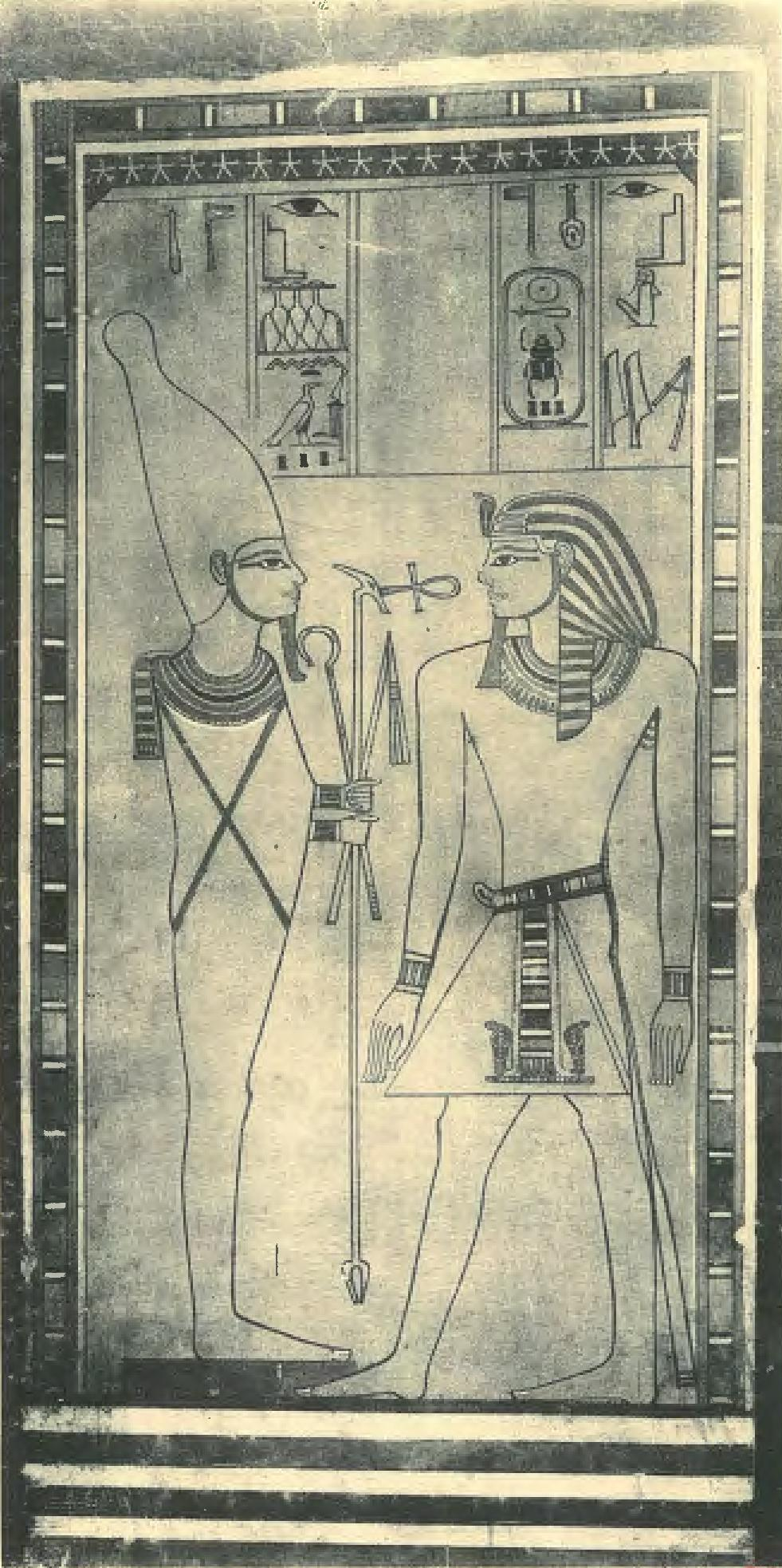

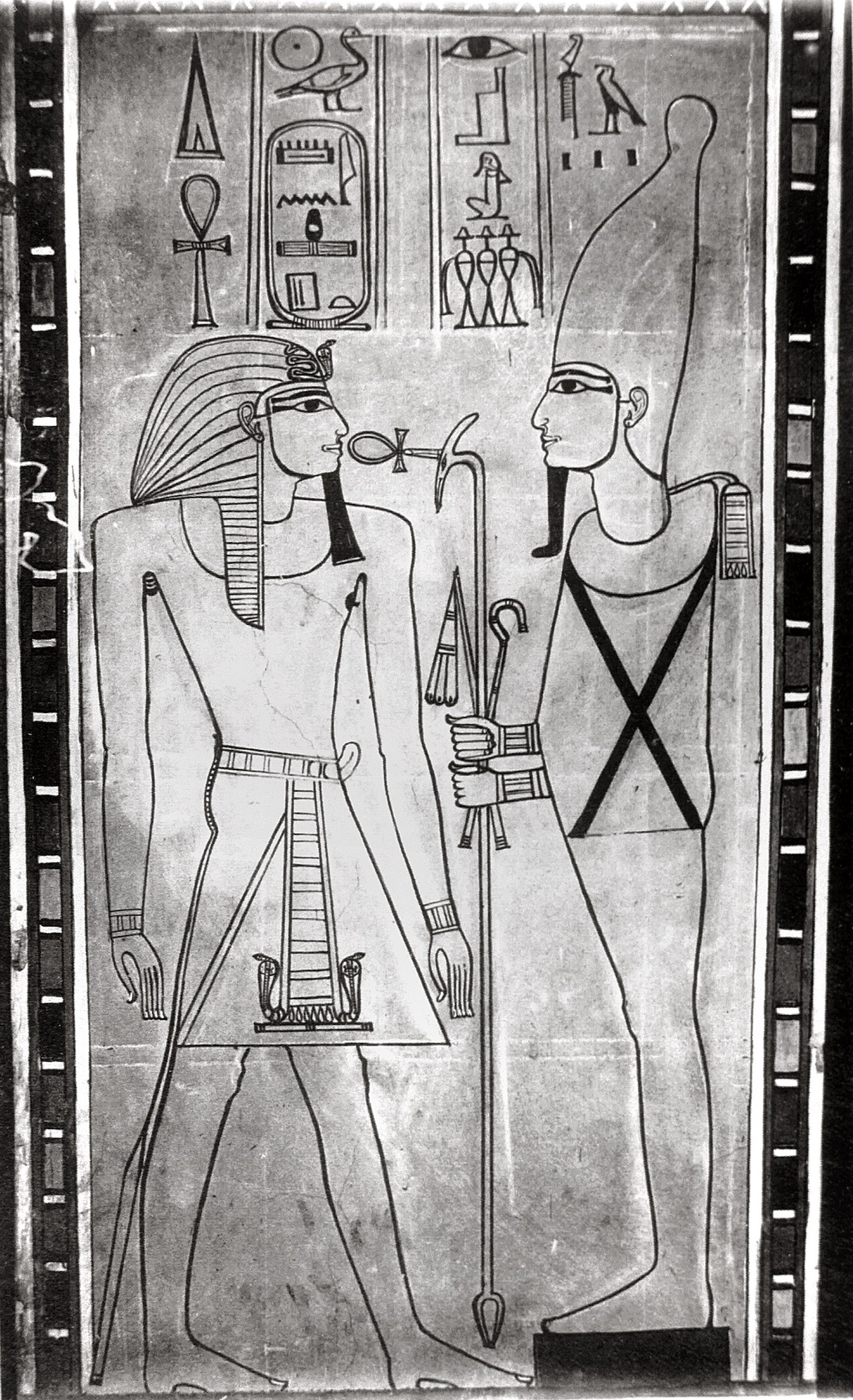

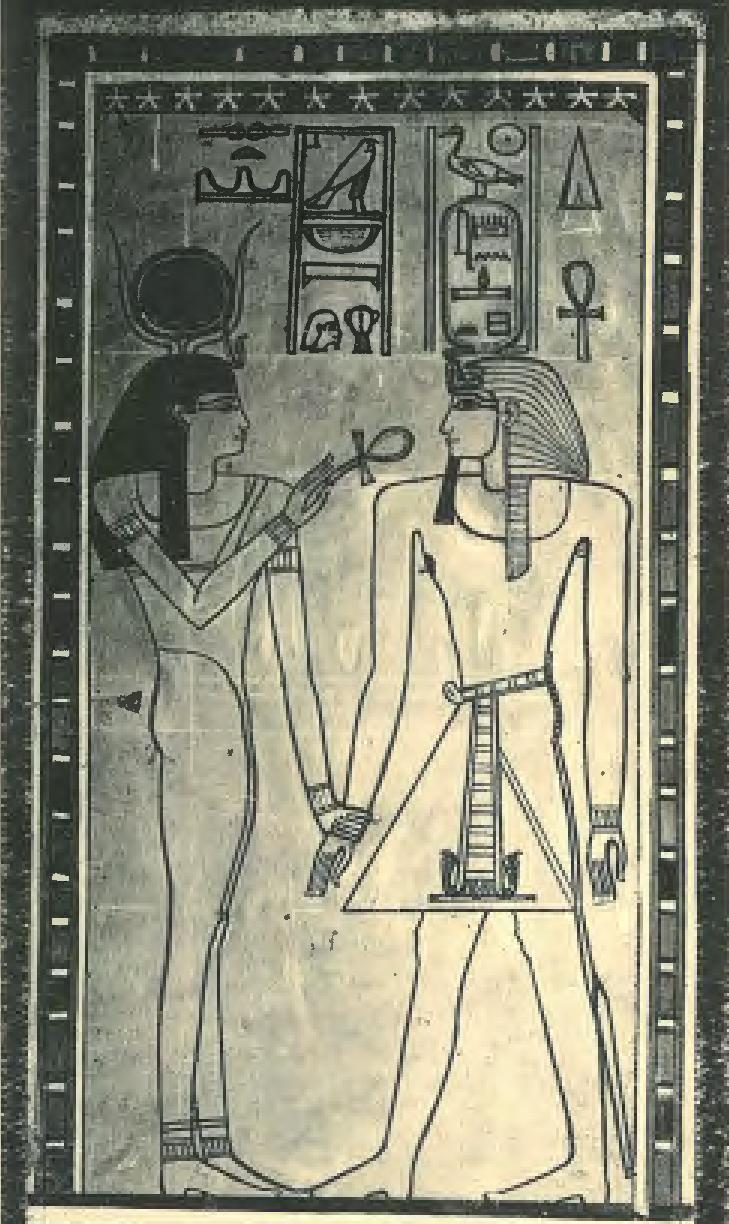
