= Maiherpri =

Ancient Egyptian noble

E22 D2 Z1 p r M17 M6
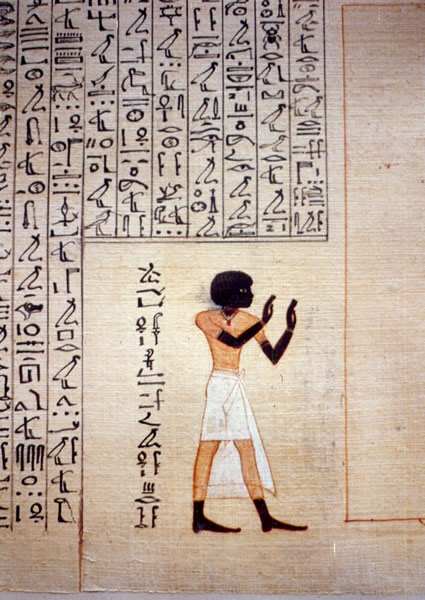
- Maiherpri as depicted in his copy of the Book of the Dead
- Born: c. 1418 BC
- Died: c. 1390 BC (aged c. 28)

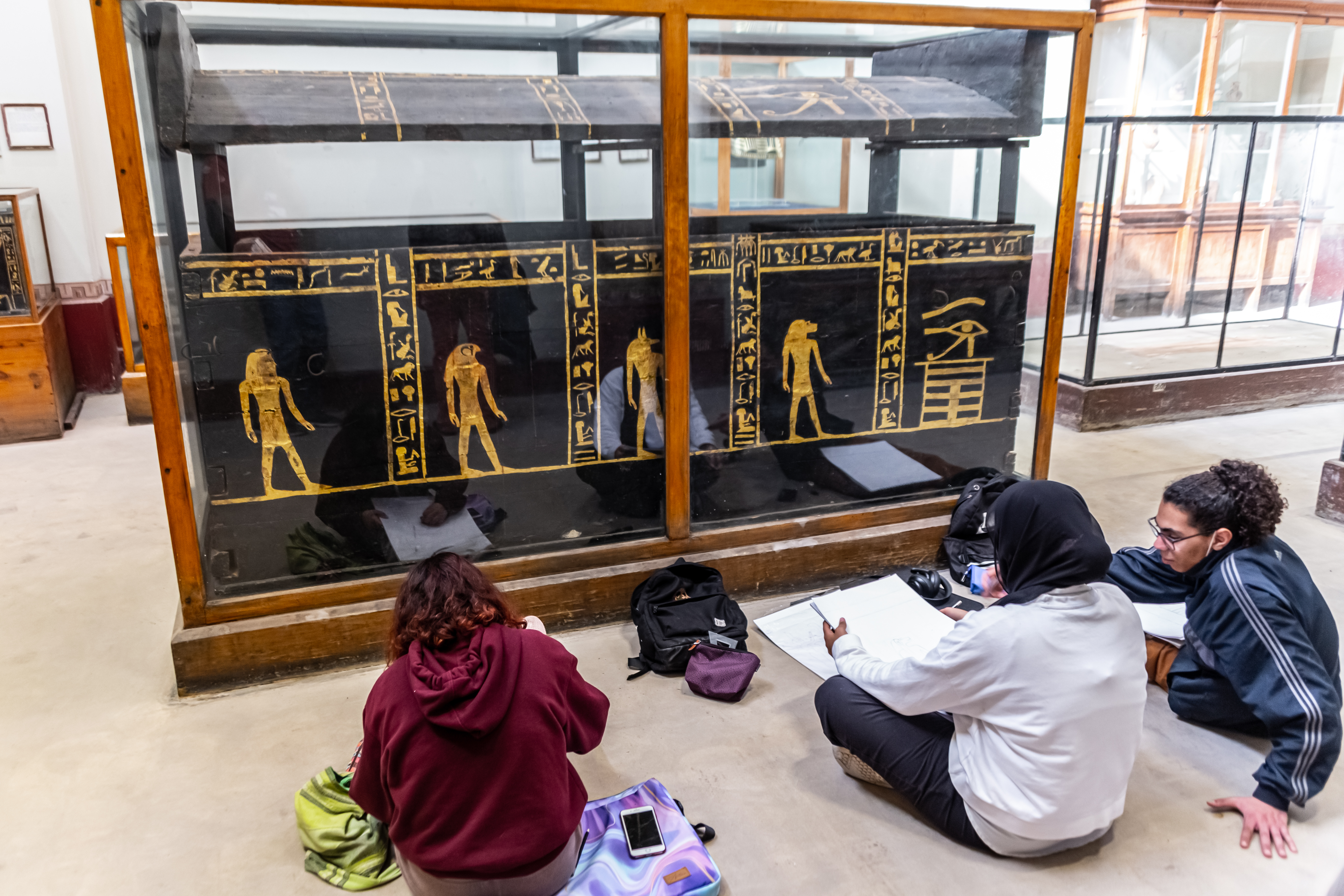
Maiherpri's sarcophagus at the Egyptian Museum

Maiherpri (c. 1418 BC - c. 1390 BC) was an ancient Egyptian noble of possibly Nubian origin buried in tomb KV36 in the Valley of the Kings. He probably lived during the reign of Thutmose IV, and received the honour of a burial in the royal necropolis. His name can be translated as Lion of the Battlefield. Amongst his titles were Child of the Nursery and Fan-bearer on the Right Side of the King. There is speculation that the first title signified that he grew up in the royal nursery as a prince of a vassal territory, or perhaps was the son of a lesser wife or concubine of the pharaoh. He was among the first during the New Kingdom to hold the second title, and was literally true in that he was by the pharaoh's side, likely as an advisor or bodyguard. This same title was also used to denote the Viceroys of Kush later in the New Kingdom.

== Tomb ==
Maiherperi's copy of the Book of the Dead, which, in the eyes of O'Connor and Cline is "[c]ertainly the most famous and arguably the most beautiful" Book of the Dead depicts him with literally "blackish" skin, leading scholars to believe he was an Egyptian of Nubian descent.

His mummy was unwrapped by Georges Daressy in March 1901, revealing a mummy whose dark skin matched that depicted on his copy of the Book of the Dead, and thought that this was likely Maiherperi's natural color, unchanged by the mummification process. He also had tightly curled, woolly hair, which turned out to be a wig that had been glued to his scalp. Examination of his body revealed he died as a young man aged 25 to 30 years.
