= Medinet Habu =

Mortuary Temple of Ramesses III

Medinet Habu مدينة هابو
- ϫⲏⲙⲉ (Coptic) (Coptic)
U28 G14 X1 O49Djamet
ḏ3mwt
in hieroglyphs
Era: Late Period
(664–332 BC)
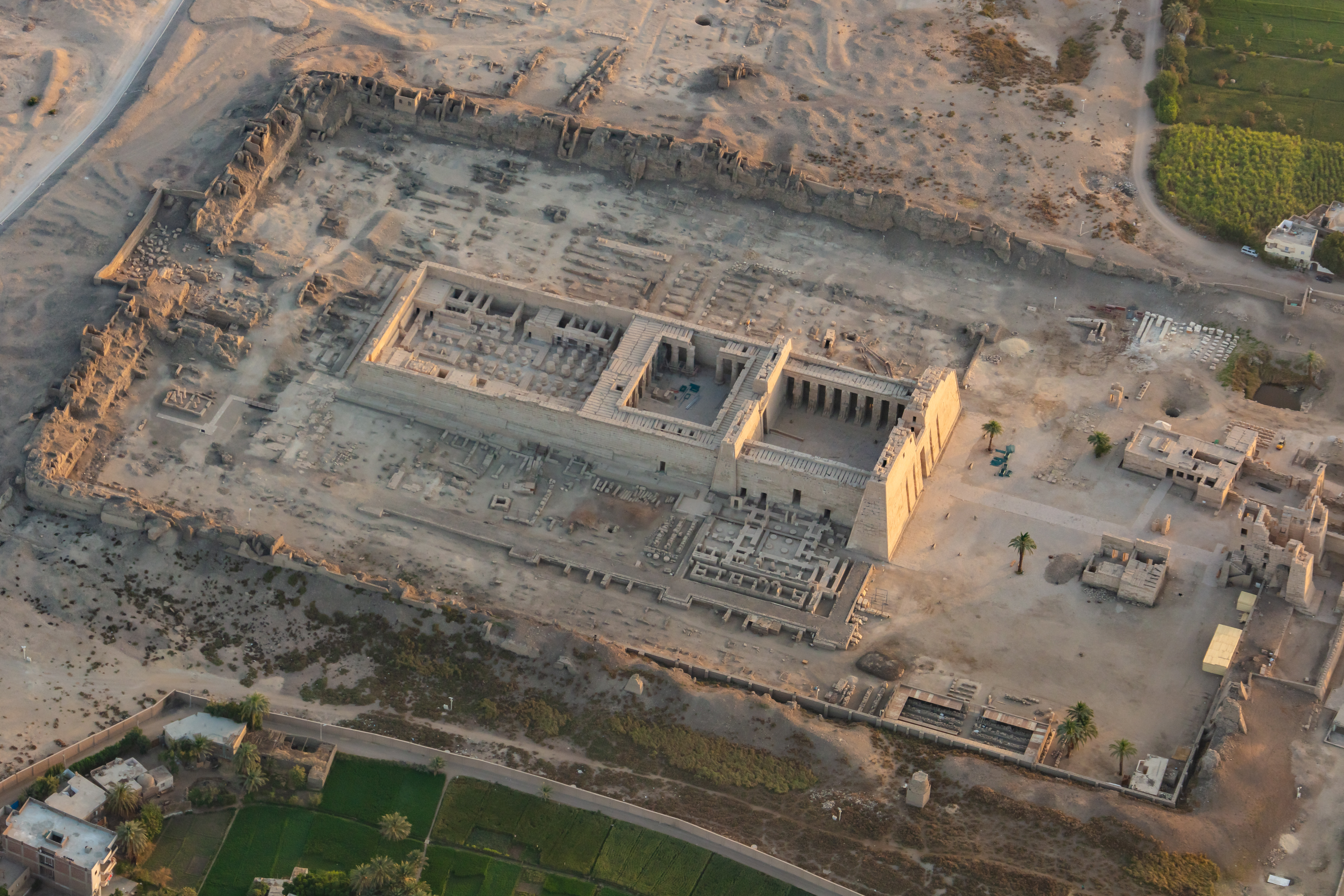

- Location within Egypt
- 25°43′11″N 32°36′03″E
- Type: Temple
- Periods: Early Dynastic Period to Early Middle Ages
- Region: Upper Egypt

History
- Abandoned: 9th century AD

Site notes
- Excavation dates: 1913, 1924-present
- Archaeologists: Theodore M. Davis, Uvo Hölscher, Harold H. Nelson

Medinet Habu (Arabic: مدينة هابو, romanized: Madīnat Hābū; Ancient Egyptian: ḏ3mwt; Sahidic Coptic: (ⲧ)ϫⲏⲙⲉ, ⲉϫⲏⲙⲉ, ϫⲏⲙⲏ, ϫⲉⲙⲉ, ϫⲉⲙⲏ, ϫⲏⲙⲓ; Bohairic Coptic: ϭⲏⲙⲓ) is an archaeological locality situated near the foot of the Theban Hills on the West Bank of the River Nile opposite the modern city of Luxor, Egypt. Although other structures are located within the area and important discoveries have also been made at these sites, the location is today associated almost synonymously with the largest and best preserved site, the Mortuary Temple of Ramesses III. It was an important New Kingdom period temple structure in the West Bank of Luxor in Egypt. Aside from its size and architectural and artistic importance, the mortuary temple is probably best known as the source of inscribed reliefs depicting the advent and defeat of the "sea peoples" during the reign of Ramesses III (c. 1186–1155 BC), including the Battle of the Delta. Some of the building materials were re-used from earlier monuments including the destroyed mortuary temple of Tausret (c. 1191–1189 BC) the last known ruler and the final pharaoh of the Nineteenth Dynasty of Egypt. The Greco-Roman period temple to Isis, Deir el-Shelwit, lies 4 kilometers to the south and re-used inscribed blocks from Medinet Habu were found there.

The site of these temples included an inhabited human settlement since pharaonic times, which continued until the 9th century, by which time it was a Coptic center called Jeme. The last remnants of the former town were cleared during the excavations at the end of the 19th century.

Located adjacent to Medinet Habu, north of the outer wall, lies the poorly preserved memorial Temple of Ay (c. 1323–1319 BC) and Horemheb (c. 1300 BC). The temple was originally built by Ay and later usurped by Horemheb who removed all inscriptions and images of Ay. A large Quartzite statue of a Pharaoh that was usurped to represent Horemheb was excavated from the ruins of the Ay and Horemheb temple in the 1930s, and is now on display in the Institute for the Study of Ancient Cultures (ISAC). Traces of previous cartouches on the statue confirm that the statue was originally of Tutankhamun, which was overwritten by cartouches of Ay and later Horemheb when the later pharaohs repurposed the statue for the temple.

Just to the northwest of Medinet Habu the Oriental Institute of Chicago, now called ISAC, excavated a large late Roman period cemetery. Most of the graves had been plundered but a number of artifacts, including 66 mummy tags inscribed in Greek were recovered.

== Etymology ==
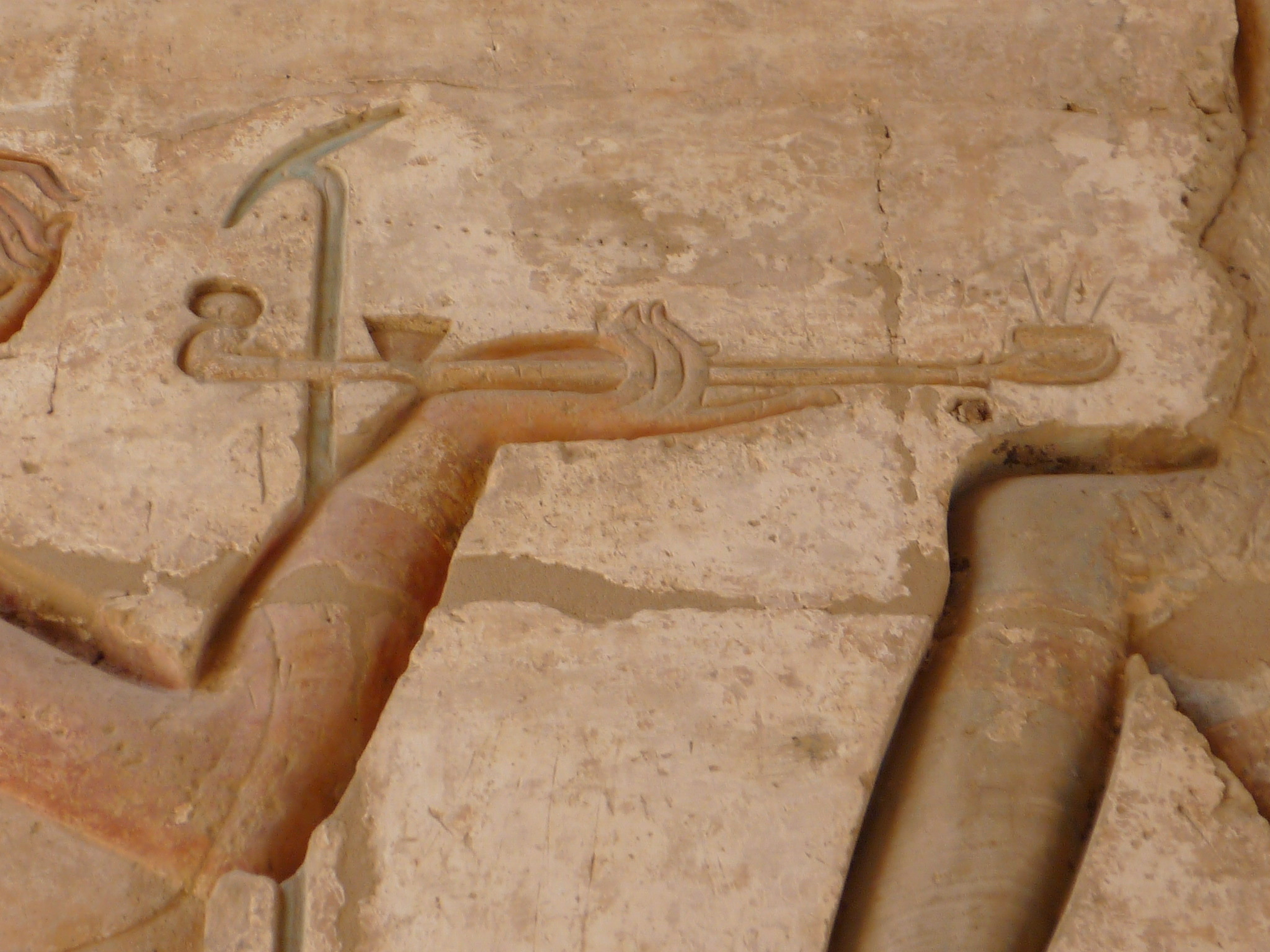
Wall relief, mortuary temple of Ramses III, Medinet Habu

The origins of the name Medinet Habu are unknown. The earliest attestations are the ones of European cartographers of the 17th–18th centuries who mention it as "Habu", "Medineh el Habou" and "Medinet Habu", with variants "Medinet Abu" and "Medinet Tabu".

The proposed etymologies include derivation from Coptic name for Luxor (Coptic: (ⲡ)ⲁⲡⲉ, romanized: (p)Ape) or from a name of high official of the 18th dynasty who was later deified known as Amenhotep, son of Hapu, (Ancient Egyptian: Jmn-ḥtp.w zꜣ ḥpw), but neither of them is considered plausible, as they do not explain the final long -u. The folk etymology attributes the name to a mythical king named Habu.

The old Arabic name of the place, Gabal Shama, (Arabic: جبل شامة) comes from Djami (Coptic: ϫⲏⲙⲉ), which in turn is derived from Ancient Egyptian ḏꜣmwt, of unclear etymology. The Bohairic Coptic form Tchami (Coptic: ϭⲏⲙⲓ) comes from Demotic Tḏmꜣʾ, which is preceded by a feminine article, as also seen in Sahidic ⲧϫⲏⲙⲉ. Whether Thebes (Ancient Greek: Θηβαι) should be a phonetic rendering of the Egyptian name is disputed.

In Greek the area was known as Memnonia (Ancient Greek: Μεμνονία) or Kastron Memnonionos (Ancient Greek: Κάστρον Μεμνονίωνος, romanized: castle of Memnon) and was associated with Memnon. This name survives in Colossi of Memnon.

== Archaeology ==
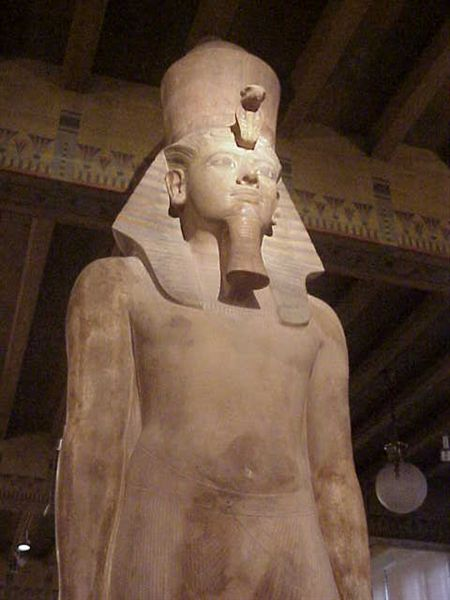
Quartzite statue of a Pharaoh that was usurped from Tutankhamun to represent Horemheb, excavated from the ruins of the Ay and Horemheb temple adjacent to Medinet Habu

The first European to describe the temple in modern literature was Vivant Denon, who visited it in 1799–1801. Jean-François Champollion spent a fortnight and a half at the site, as (Médinet-Habou), in 1829 as part of the Franco-Tuscan Expedition. John Gardner Wilkinson during 12 years in Egypt recording inscriptions and paintings spent a long period at Thebes. A Prussian expedition led by Karl Richard Lepsius worked in Thebes, mainly at Medinet Habu, from November 1844 until April 1845.

Work, under the direction of Georges Daressy, Marius Bonnefoy, and Charles Gabet, on the temple took place sporadically between 1859 and 1899, under the auspices of the Egyptian Department of Antiquities to prepare it for tourism. During these decades the main temple was cleared, and a large number of the Greco-Roman period buildings, including a substantial Byzantine Church in the second court, were destroyed without notes or records being taken.

Theodore M. Davis excavated at Medinet Habu in 1913 focusing primarily on the "Palace" of Rameses III along the southern side of the mortuary temple.

The further excavation, recording and conservation of the temple has been facilitated in chief part by the Architectural and Epigraphic Surveys of the University of Chicago Oriental Institute, almost continuously since 1924. The Architectural Survey, led by Uvo Hölscher, worked for five seasons until 1932. At the start the complex was "covered for the most part with mounds of rubbish ranging in height from 3 to 6 meters, the remains of houses from the former Coptic town of Habu". At the start of work they reported that the "Egyptian Antiquities Service was excavating Medinet Habu in spring 1925, clearing an area in the south of the precinct, west of the Palace" activity which is otherwise not recorded. The University of Chicago Oriental Institute Epigraphic Survey under the direction of Harold Hayden Nelson also began in 1924 and the program continues to the present day, excepting a closure between 1940 and 1946 due to World War II. In 1948 Richard Anthony Parker became director of the Epigraphic Survey, followed by George Hughes, Charles Nims, Edward F. Wente, Kent Weeks, Lanny Bell, Peter Dorman, and W. Raymond Johnson in succeeding years. The survey has worked on the long process of photographing, recording, and publishing all reliefs and inscriptions at Medinet Habu.

== Mortuary Temple of Ramesses III ==
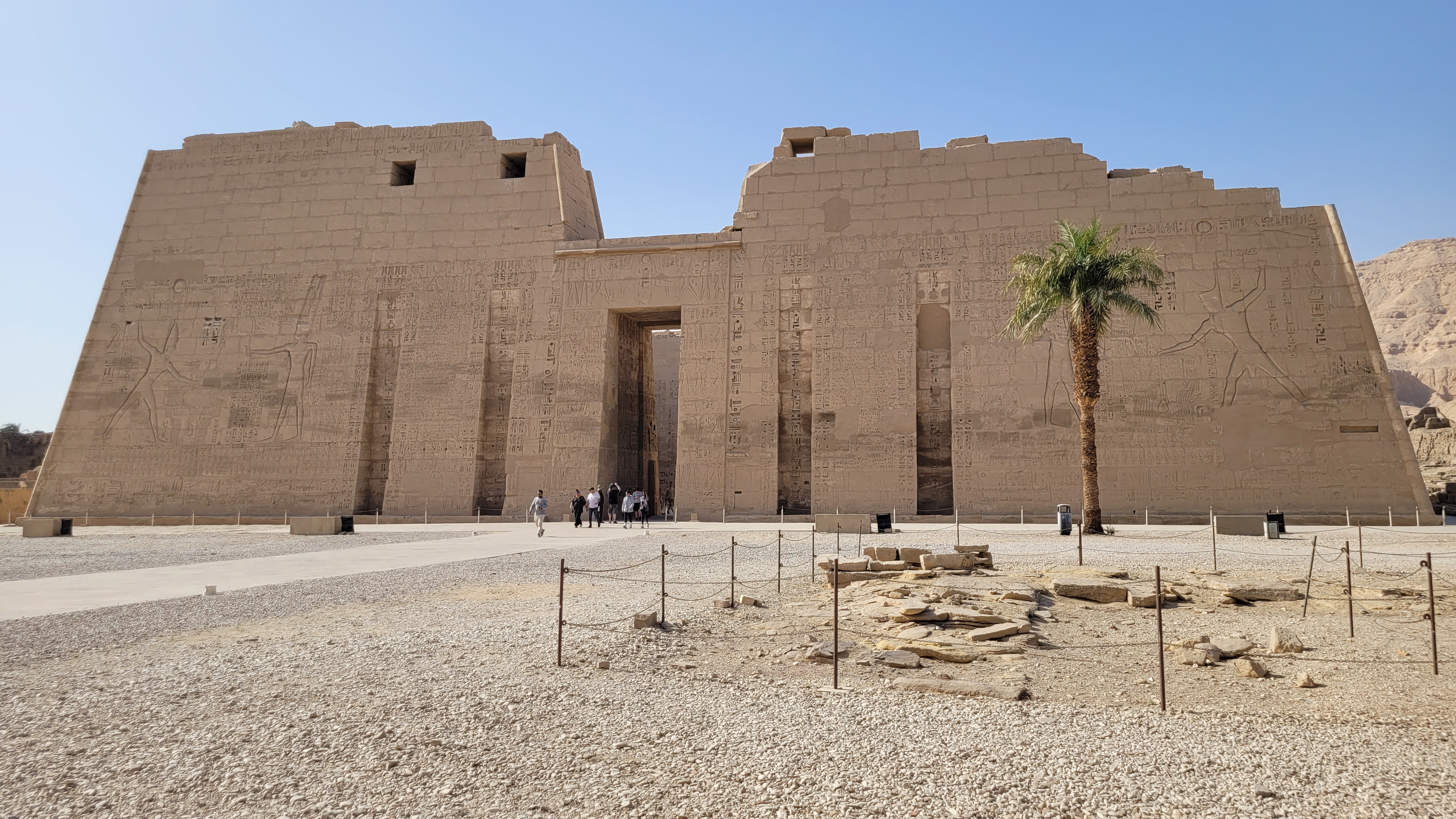
Temple of Ramesses III

The temple, some 150 m (490 ft) long, is of orthodox design, and closely resembles the nearby mortuary temple of Ramesses II (the Ramesseum). The full formal name of the temple was "The Temple of Usermare-Meriamon (called) 'United-with-Eternity' in the estate of Amon on the West of Thebes". Many of the inscriptions and scenes are in similar locations and in some cases largely copied. The temple precinct measures approximately 210 m (690 ft). by 300 m (1,000 ft) and contains more than 7,000 m^{2} (1.7 acres) of decorated wall reliefs. The temple contains 48 rooms of which 8 constitute the Mortuary Suite of Rameses III. The reliefs in the Mortuary Suite were devoted to the funerary process of Rameses III as Osiride king. The remaining rooms contain reliefs showing the various acts of the living pharaoh. Its walls are relatively well preserved and it is surrounded by a massive mudbrick inner enclosure wall. A radiocarbon sample from the wall yielded a date of 1050-1020 ± 50BC. The area between the temple and inner wall originally held numerous temple outbuildings now mostly lost.

The entire south wall is inscribed with a liturgical calendar containing 1470 lines of hieroglyphs. The Ramesseum of Ramesses II was used as a source for much of the text though that exemplar is now much damaged. The text is mainly lists of offerings to be prepared for daily, monthly, and annual feasts. Those dates are in the civil calendar (vs one of the two Egyptian religious calendars). An excerpt from Ramesses Ill's Address to Amon-Re:

"Address of the King of Upper and Lower Egypt, Lord of the Two Lands: Usermaatre Meriamon; Son of Re, Lord of Thrones: Ramesses, Prince of On, to his father Amon-Re, King of the Gods. "Behold, I know eternity, 0 my august father, and I am not ignorant of everlastingness. "My heart is glad for I know your strength is more than that of the [other] gods, since it is you who has fashioned their images and created their majesties [and] you have made the sky ...."

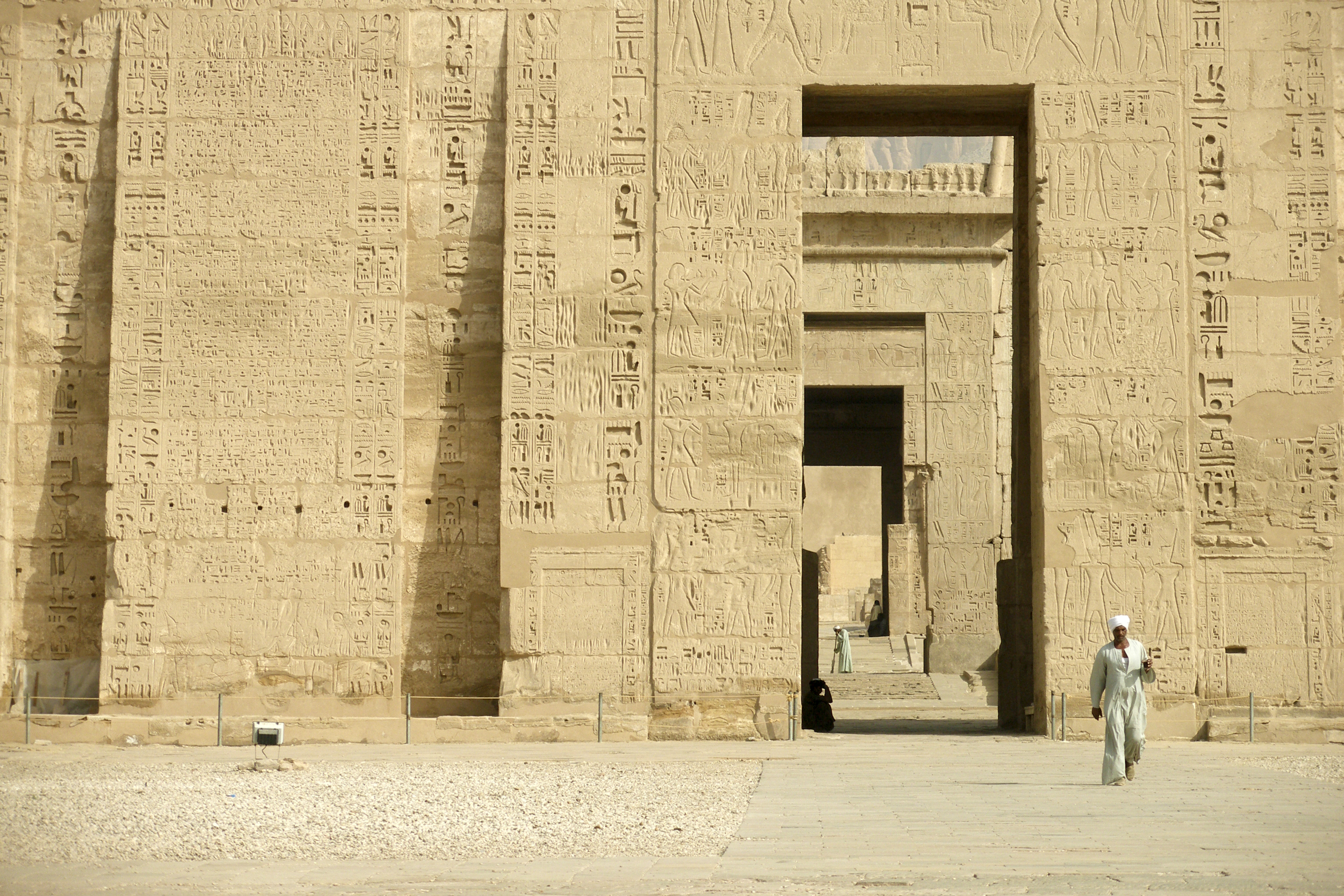
First Pylon, Temple of Ramesses III at Medinet Habu.

The first pylon leads into an open courtyard, lined with colossal statues of Ramesses III as Osiris on one side, and uncarved columns on the other. The second pylon leads into a peristyle hall, again featuring columns in the shape of Ramesses. The third pylon is reached by continuing up a ramp that leads through a columned portico and then opens into a large hypostyle hall (which has lost its roof). Reliefs and actual heads of foreign captives were also found placed within the temple, perhaps in an attempt to symbolise the king's control over Syria and Nubia.

In the Greco-Roman and Byzantine Empire period, there was a church inside the temple structure, which has since been removed. Some of the carvings in the main wall of the temple have been altered by Christian carvings.

Ten tombs from the 6th to 8th century BC were found in the inner sanctum of the mortuary temple. Three could be identified including Nesterwy, daughter of 23rd dynasty pharaoh Rudamun, described as a "Songstress in the House of Amen".

=== Battle inscriptions ===
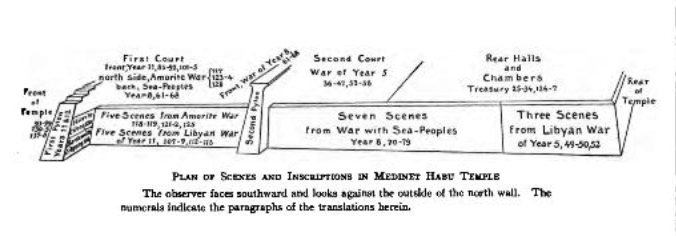
Medinet Habu temple inscriptions

There are four long inscriptions describing the battles and deeds of Rameses III at the temple. The inscriptions cover:

- Year 5 - First Libyan War. On the temple exterior, second court, south wall, lower register. While dated "Year 5" it also mentions events of the Northern War of year 8.

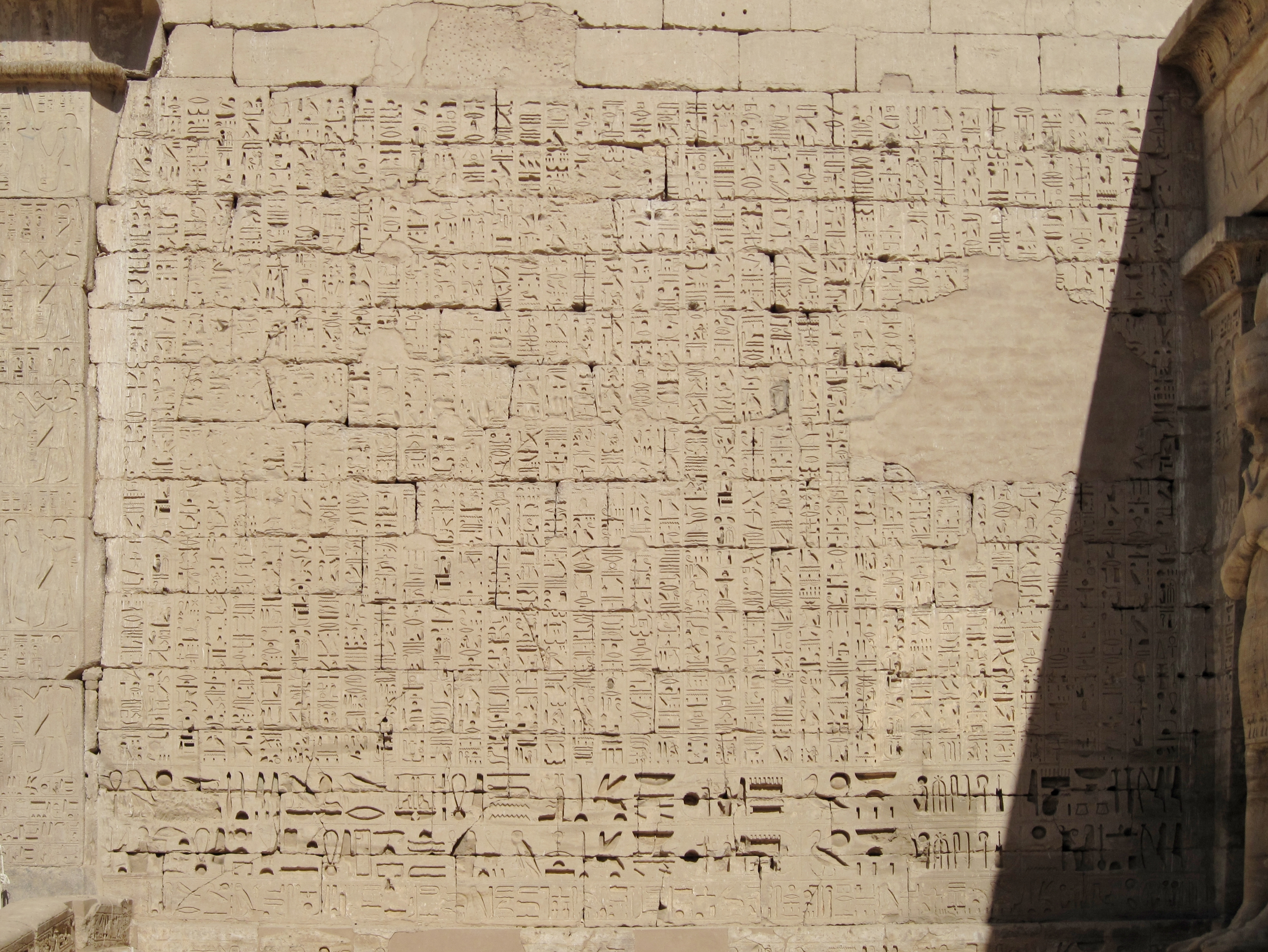
Ramses III year 8 inscription at Medinet Habu

- Year 8 - Temple interior, first court, west wall, north of great doorway. Northern War. Well preserved and of great interest to historians as well as the source of endless speculation and wishful thinking by others. The inscription details the invasion from the north, the battle preparations of Rameses III, and his complete defeat of the invaders. The section of most interest:

"... As for the foreign countries, they made a [conspiracy] in their isles. [Removed] and scattered in the fray were the lands at one time. No land could stand before their arms, from Hatti, Kode, Carchemish, Yereth, 17 and Yeres on," (but they were) cut off at [one time]. A camp [was set up] in one place in Amor. They desolated its people, and its land was like that which has never come into being. They were coming, while the flame was prepared before them, forward toward Egypt. Their confederation was the Peleset, Theker, Shekelesh, Denye(n), and Weshesh, lands united. They laid their hands upon the lands to the (very) circuit of the earth, their hearts confident and trusting: 'Our plans will succeed!' ..."

- Year 11 - Second Libyan, or Meshwesh, War (poorly preserved). The inscription begins south of the main gateway of the temple and continues on the north of the gateway. The Meshwesh were a western Libyan tribe and were apparently prompted by the Rebu-Libyans to occupy the Egyptian Delta, conquering the Tehenu people who lived in the desert there. Rameses III reports crushing them and taking many captives including "chief's son, their women, children, weapons, and domestic cattle". The captives were made slaves.
- Year 12 - Deeds of Rameses III up to that point. On the temple exterior, face of first pylon, south of great gateway. Badly weathered to the point of making it difficult to properly interpret. Talks about the security of Egypt gained by his defeat of all foreign invaders (refers largely to the deeds of the Year 8 inscription) and his work on the Temple of Amon (Medinet Habu).

=== Military reliefs ===
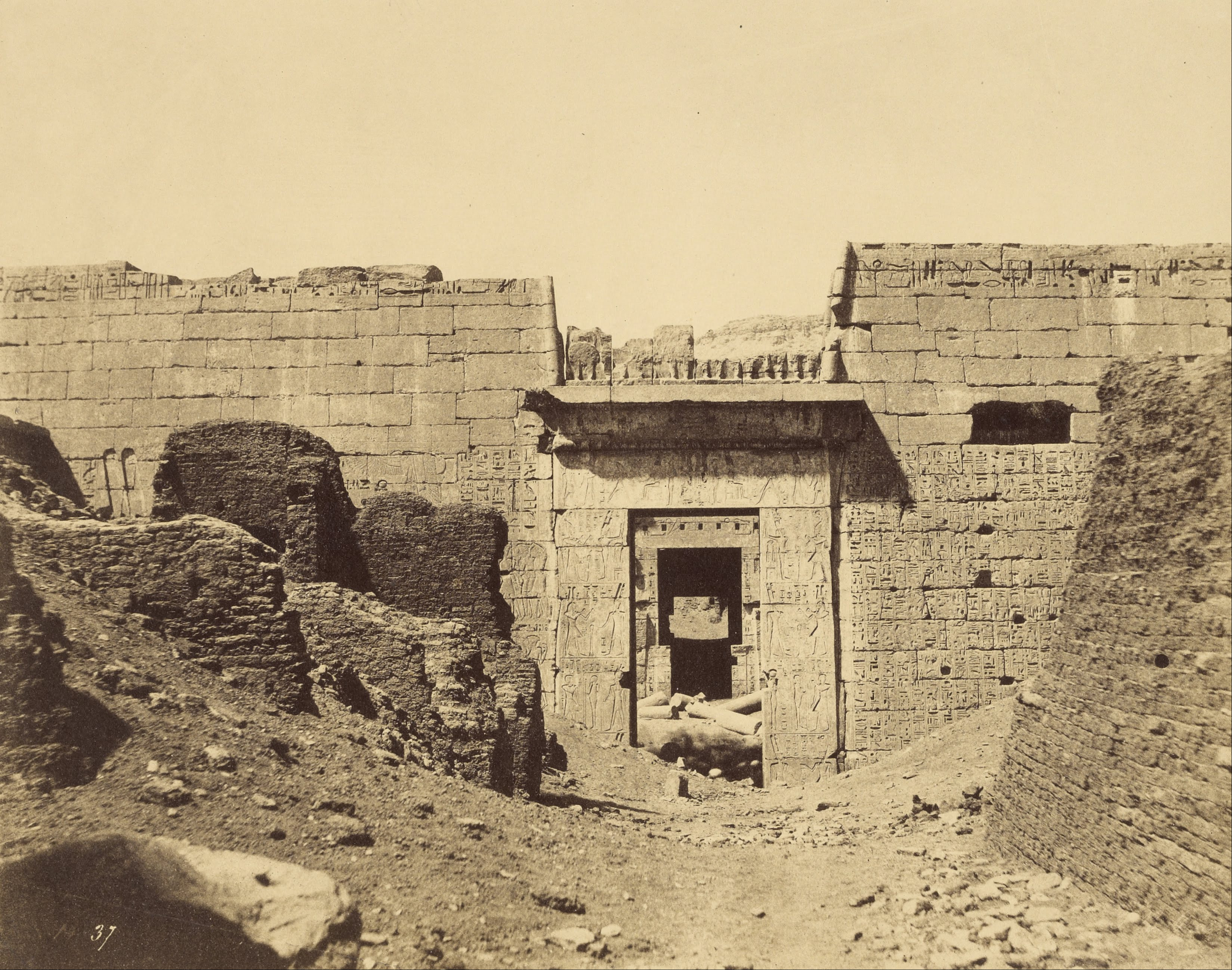
John Beasley Greene's 1854 photo of the temple showing the second pylon before excavations (Albumenized salt, from a calotype negative)

The western and northern walls of the mortuary temple contain a number of reliefs detailing the military activities of Rameses III including his conflicts with the Nubians and Libyans. The combat scenes are accompanied by those showing preparations, for battle and distribution of weapons, divine intervention, returning victorious from battle, lion hunt, and the presenting of booty to the gods. These mostly follow the standard pharonic formula.

On the north wall are a series of 13 scenes which are viewed as a single military campaign beginning with the Libyans and ending with the "sea peoples". In one relief Rameses III and his troops rain arrows down on opponents in ships. In another he leads his troops in the destruction of feather helmeted opponents who are accompanied by women and children in oxcarts. Over a century ago Gaston Maspero proposed that these two panels represented the invasion of Egypt by purported "sea peoples" from Anatolia, a narrative which has now entered common public usage.

=== Topographical lists ===
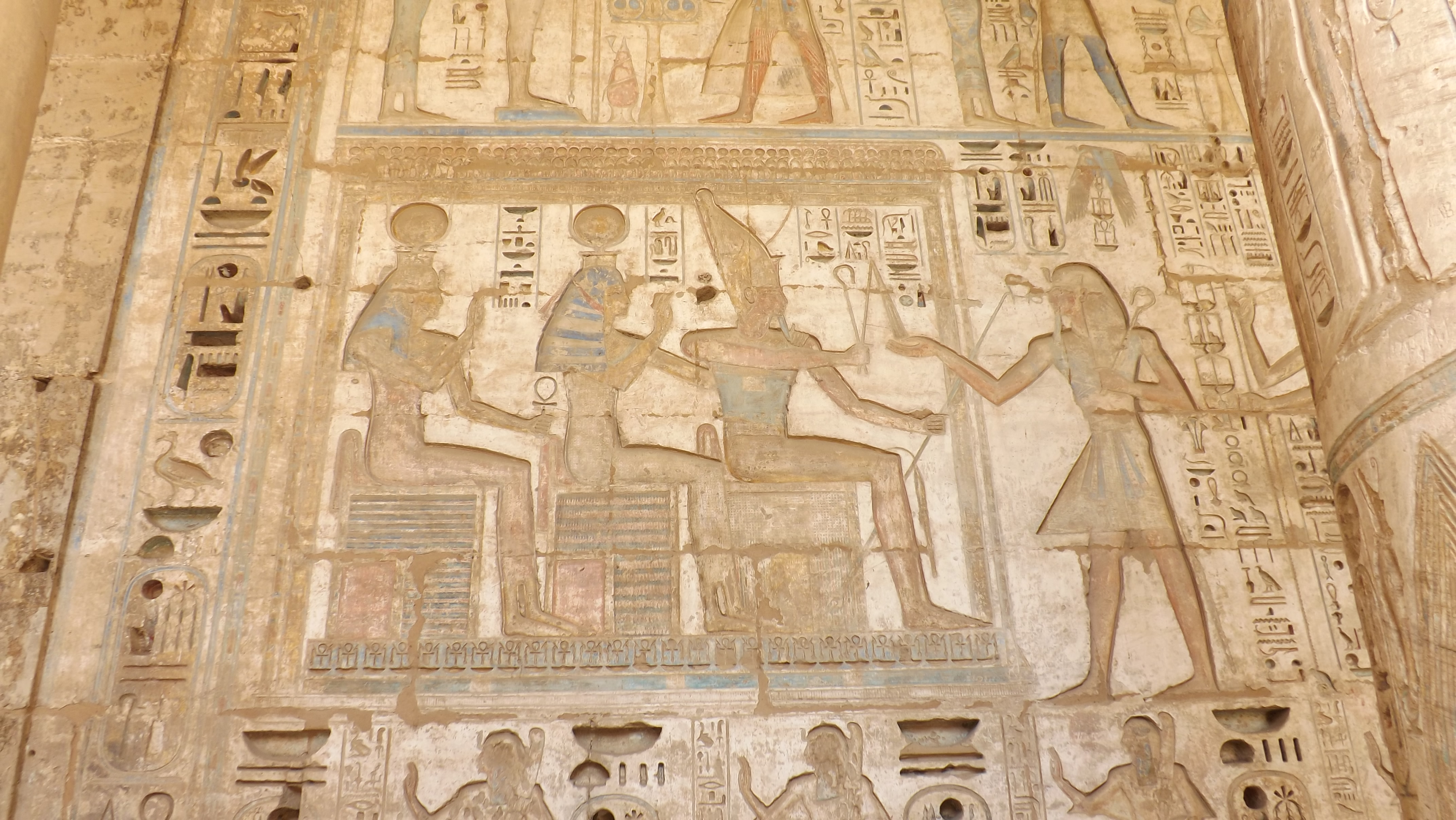
Inscribed scene at Mortuary Temple of Rameses III

Two topographical lists, each toponym in an oval name-shield, are engraved on the front pylon of the mortuary temple with some topynyms now damaged. The identity of many localities is either unknown or is disputed. A number were copied from the much damaged topographical list of Rameses II at Karnak. There are 125 mostly Levantine entrees on the south tower of the pylon with the initial 6 being African. The northern tower held a list of mostly African localities, primarily in Nubia. Both lists are topped by a scene of Rameses III smiting kneeling enemies. Another topographical list was inscribed by Rameses IV on the walls of the rear terrace, in the form of scenes showing the pharaoh making offering to the local deity of the locality. They are much damaged by time and later construction though some remain legible.

=== Medinet Habu king list ===
The memorial temple of Ramesses III (Mortuary Temple of Ramesses III) at Medinet Habu contains a minor list of pharaohs of the New Kingdom of Egypt. The inscriptions closely resemble the Ramesseum king list, which is a similar scene of Ramesses II, which was used as a template for the scenes here.

The scene shows Ramesses III participating in the ceremonies of the Festival of Min where statues of ancestral kings are carried in an elaborate procession to make offerings to Min. It contains 16 cartouches with the names of nine pharaohs divided into two parts.

The sparse outline of the scene was published by Vivant Denon in 1802, who was part of Napoleon's expedition to Egypt in 1798 to 1801, which published a slightly more detailed scene in 1809. Thirty years later, the complete scene including the cartouches of the kings was published by John Gardner Wilkinson in 1837, followed by Champollion and Lepsius. All the 19th-century editions contain omissions and errors, but in 1940 the Epigraphic Survey published the definitive (and complete) rendering of the scenes.

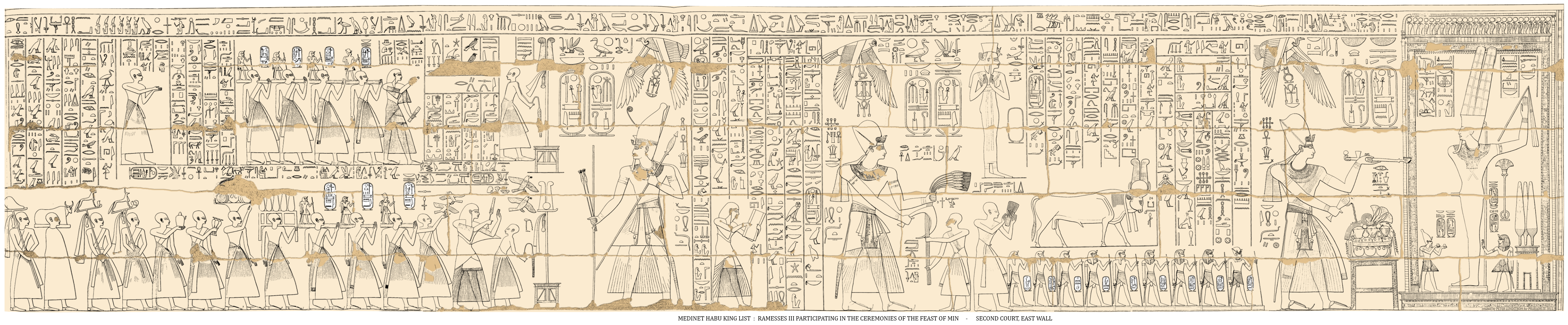
Medinet Habu king list (Epigraphic Survey)

The scene is divided in two parts, on the left side, 7 statues of ancestors are being carried in a procession. The right side is led by nine kings.

The rulers mentioned in the list
Left procession			Right procession		
#	Pharaoh	Inscription (throne name)	#	Pharaoh	Inscription (throne name)
1	Ramesses III	Usermaatre-meryamun	8	Ramesses III	Usermaatre-meryamun
2	Setnakhte	Userkhaure-meryamun	9	Setnakhte	Userkhaure-meryamun
3	Ramesses II	Usermaatre-setepenre	10	Seti II	Userkheperure-setepenre
4	Merenptah	Baenre-meryamun	11	Merenptah	Baenre-meryamun
5	Ramesses III	Usermaatre-meryamun	12	Ramesses II	Usermaatre-setepenre
6	Setnakhte	Userkhaure-meryamun	13	Seti I	Menmaatre
7	Seti II	Userkheperure-setepenre	14	Ramesses I	Menpehtyre
			15	Horemheb	Djeserkheperure-setepenre
			16	Amenhotep III	Nebmaatre

It remains in situ on the eastern second pylon in the second court, in the upper register on the eastern wall. It's also seen by some as an addition to the Abydos King List, as the Medinet Habu list contains some Rammasside pharaohs who reigned after the Abydos list was made.

=== Procession of Princes ===
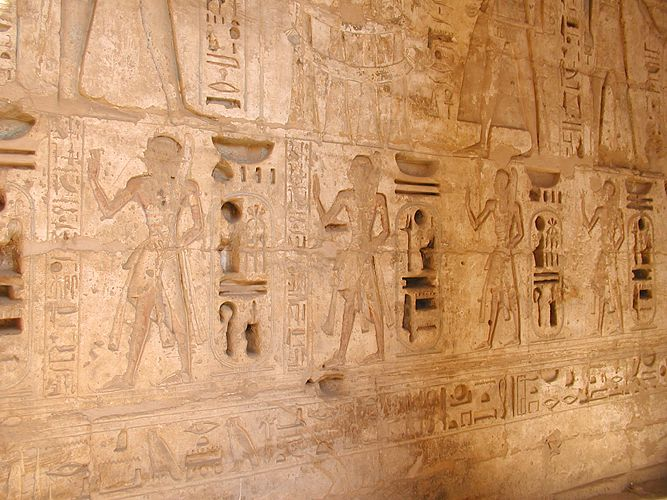
Princes' procession, Medinet Habu

On both sides of the doorway on the west wall of the temple portico there are long processions of royal sons. This reflects an earlier similar relief of Rameses II at Luxor showing a procession of princes at the fest of Opet. The 1st three sons are dressed in flowing robes while the rest are more simply dressed. Originally the figures had no inscriptions, with only deeply cut cartouches of Rameses III between them. A shorter procession of royal daughters, unidentified, are on the south wall. At a later date names and titles were inscribed for ten of the sons. When the new inscriptions were added, and their implications, have been long debated. It is generally assumed they were added by either Ramesses IV, Ramesses V and/or Ramesses VI but this is uncertain. At a later date the fourth figure was further modified by Ramesses VIII after his own ascension for reasons that are uncertain. Different identities have been applied to some of the figures including Khaemwaset, Meryatum II, Montuherkhopshef, Meryamun, Pareherwenemef, and Amun-her-khepeshef.

== Outer court of Mortuary Temple of Ramesses III ==
The Mortuary Temple grounds are enclosed by a 315 meter by 210 meter mudbrick temenos wall, rising 18 meters high and 10 meters in thickness. It encompassed 66000 square meters. The wall contain fortified gates in the eastern and western walls. The enclosed grounds hold a few minor archaeological sites. The outer court originally included a large garden with a 20 meter by 18 meter sacred pool, described in the Papyrus Harris I of Ramesses III.

"In front of it [= the temple] I dug a pool copious with water, planted with trees and verdant as the Delta. . . . It was surrounded by arbors, courtyards, and orchards laden with fruit and flowers for thy {= Amon’s] countenance. I built their pavilions . .. and I excavated a pool before them, adorned with lotus blossoms."

=== Palace of Ramesses III ===
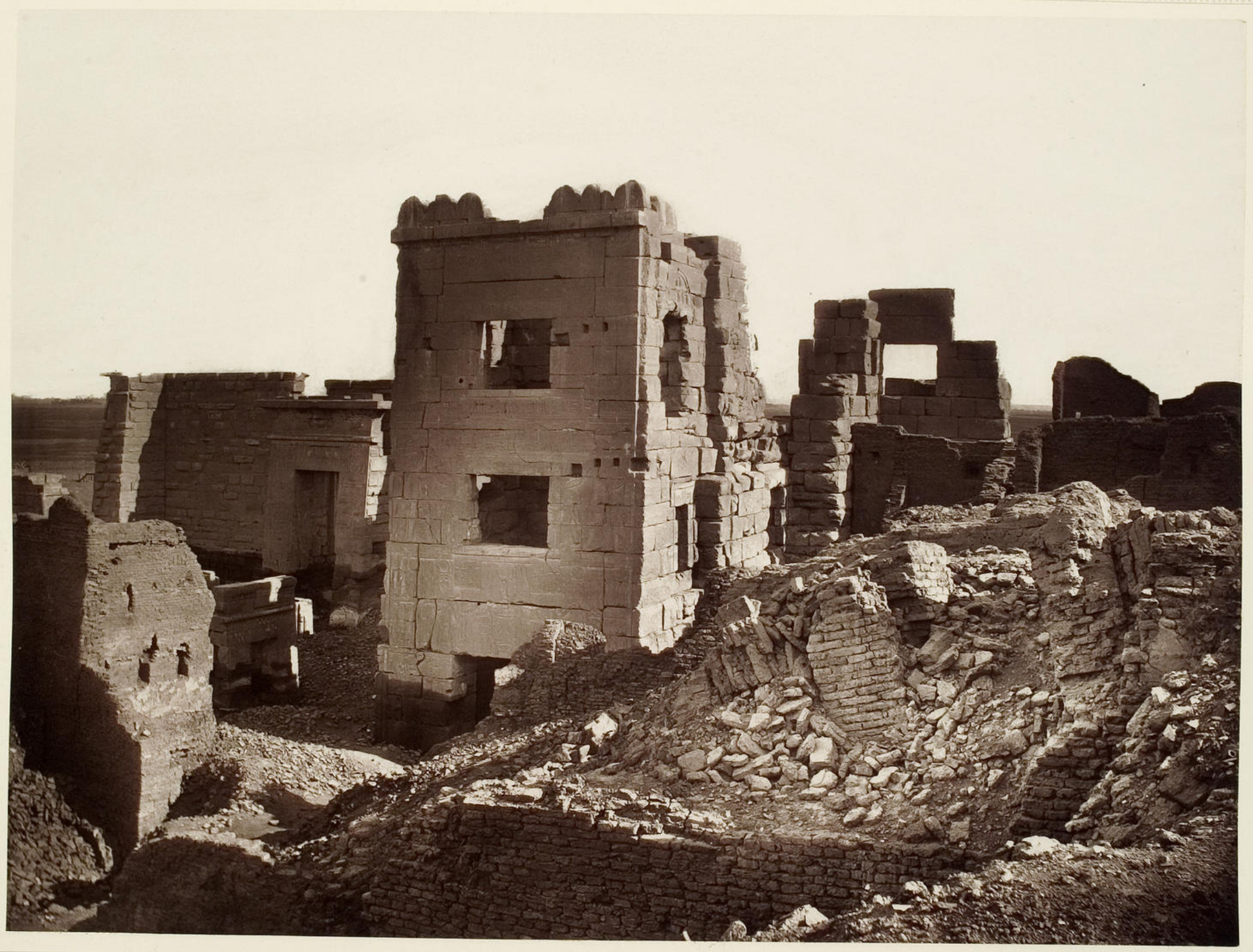
Palace in 1874 before its remaining brickwork was cleared in 1913 excavation

The area to the south of the mortuary temple, between the pylons, was occupied by the mudbrick palace of Ramesses III. It would have been used by the king only on religious festival occasions at which he presided over and to act as his "Mansion of Millions of Years" after his death. It had two construction phases. The first phase was a near copy of the earlier Ramesseum palace of Ramesses II. It had two areas, a main throne room complex and a hallway with a series of 6 small two room apartments. The throne complex was entered via a stairway leading into an antechamber with 16 columns (window of appearances). The antechamber led into a 4 column audience hall with throne dais. The second construction phase used a much more elaborate and larger plan and added a second story. It now filled the entire space between the inner enclosure walls and the small apartments were turned into 3 large units, with bathrooms. The palace was much damaged by the 1913 excavation but the ground plan of the 2nd temple has been restored for visitors to see.

=== Small Temple ===
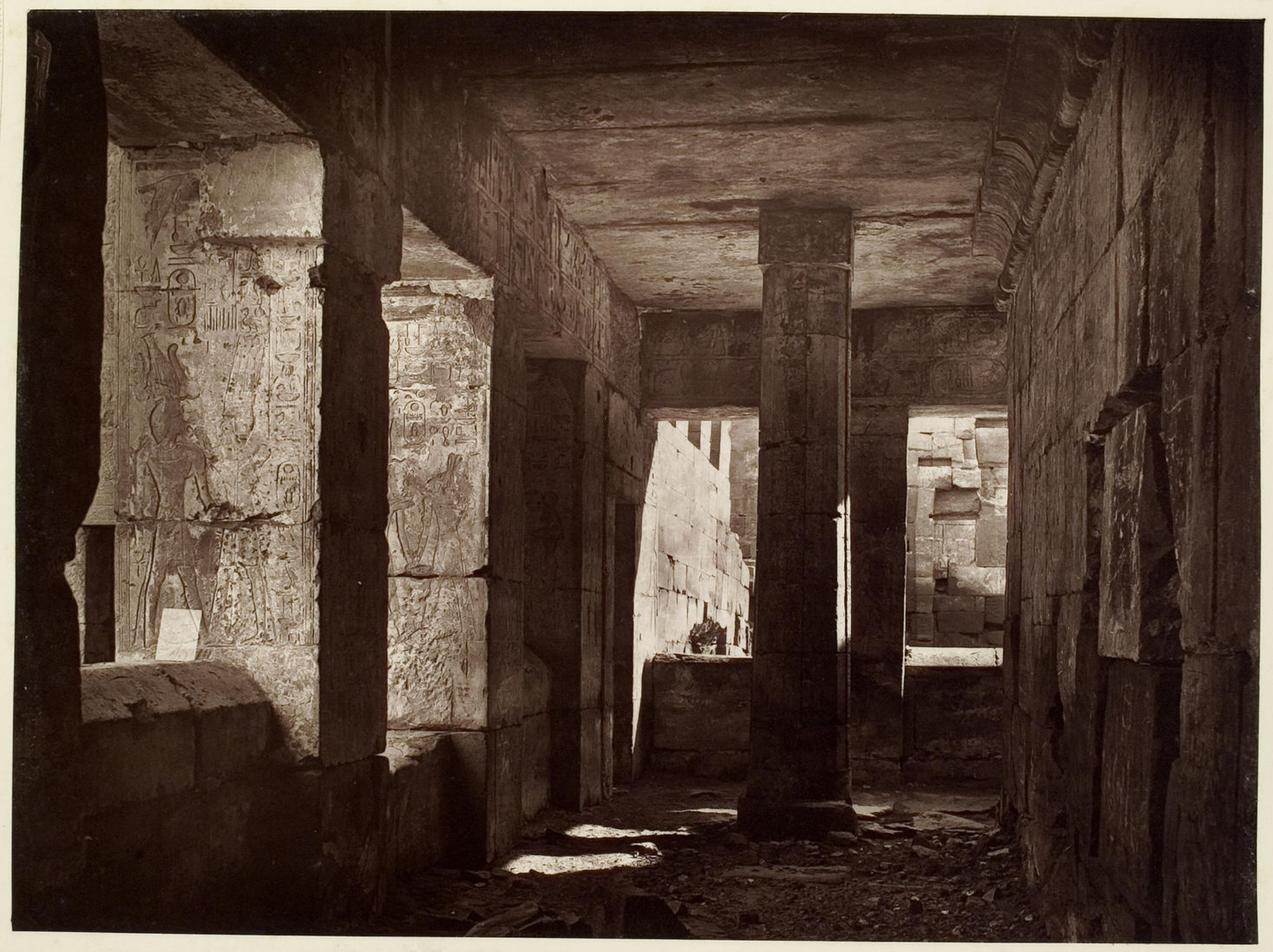
Interior of the Small Temple in 1874

Just right of the entrance to the Mortuary Temple of Ramesses III is the Small Temple. Excavations found early remains dating back to at least the early New Kingdom and possibly the Middle Kingdom (11th Dynasty). Originally it was dedicated the Ogdoad a group of eight Egyptian gods which were closely associated with Amun. The 18th Dynasty ruler Hatshepsut (c. 1479 – 1458 BC) reported that the temple was "a sacred place, which the kings of Lower Egypt have [ne]glected" and her co-ruler Thutmose III (c. 1479-1425 BC) left an inscription there that "he found (it) ruined". Hatshepsut began work restoring the temple but died after completing part of the sanctuary. The work was completed by Thutmose III (who also excised all mentions of Hatshepsut in the temple). The sanctuary consists of six rooms, with one room containing large statues of Amun and Thutmose III. In later periods major additions to this were constructed.

In his construction at Medinet Habu, Rameses III was careful to respect the older temple. The 11th Dynasty elevated Amun to a major god and the temple became largely associated with him. It has undergone many alterations and modifications over the years, partially in the 20th, 25th, 26th, 29th and 30th dynasties and the Greco-Roman period. A long inscription was added by Pinedjem I (c. 1070-1055 BC) High Priest of Amun at Thebes.

=== Saite Chapels ===
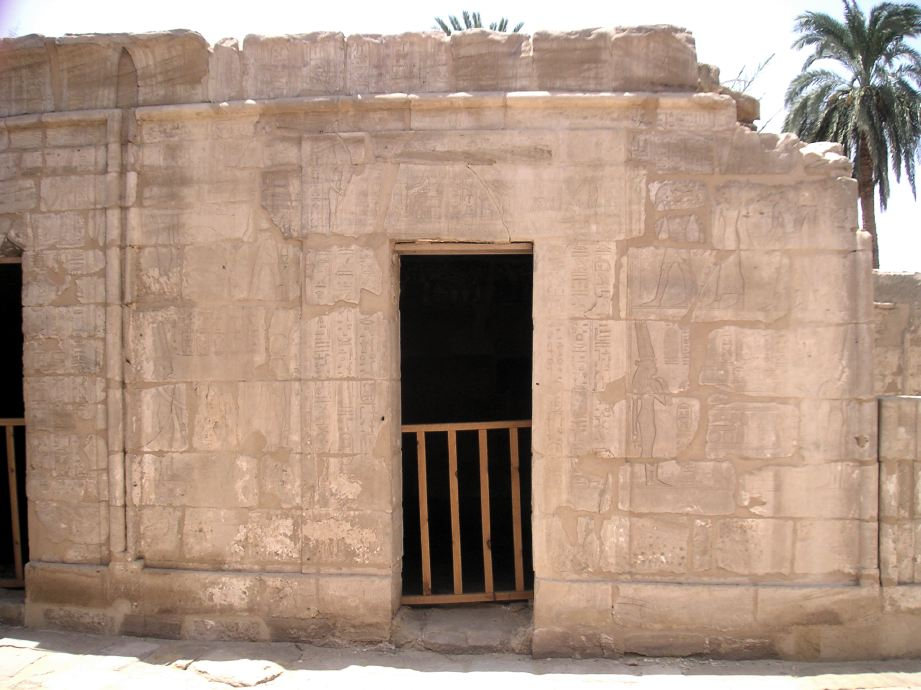
Sight of the entry of the funerary vault of the divine adortrice of Amun Shepenupet II, at Medinet Habou - 25th dynasty of Egypt

In the northeast corner of the outer court four combined mausoleums and mortuary shrines were built between the 8th and 6th centuries BC to the God's Wife of Amun (Divine Votaresses) in the area of the former pool of Ramses III of which two are still extant. The chapels were of Shepenwepet I, Amenardis I, Shepenwepet II, and Ankhnesneferibré. The chapel of Shepenwepet II was modified to also hold a later adortrice, Nitocris I, daughter of pharaoh Psamtik I (664–610 BC). The chapels were constructed mainly of Nubian siliceous sandstone from the quary at Gebel el-Silsila.

=== Tomb of Harsiese ===
The tomb of Harsiese (c. 880–860 BC), Third Intermediate Period ruler of Thebes, was found in 1932. The superstructure was lost in antiquity (though a re-used inscribed block was later found) but the substructure remained. The substructure had an "inclined entrance passage with steps cut in the floor, an antechamber, and a burial chamber". It was located "just outside the enclosure wall of the small temple of Amun called 'Holiest of Places'".

"... in the trough of a granite coffin (JE 60137) made for Ramesses II's sister, Henutmire, (and) closed with a hawk-Headed lid. When cleared, four canopic jars were found....No trace of any lids have survived, suggesting that such items may have been of [perishable] wood[.]"

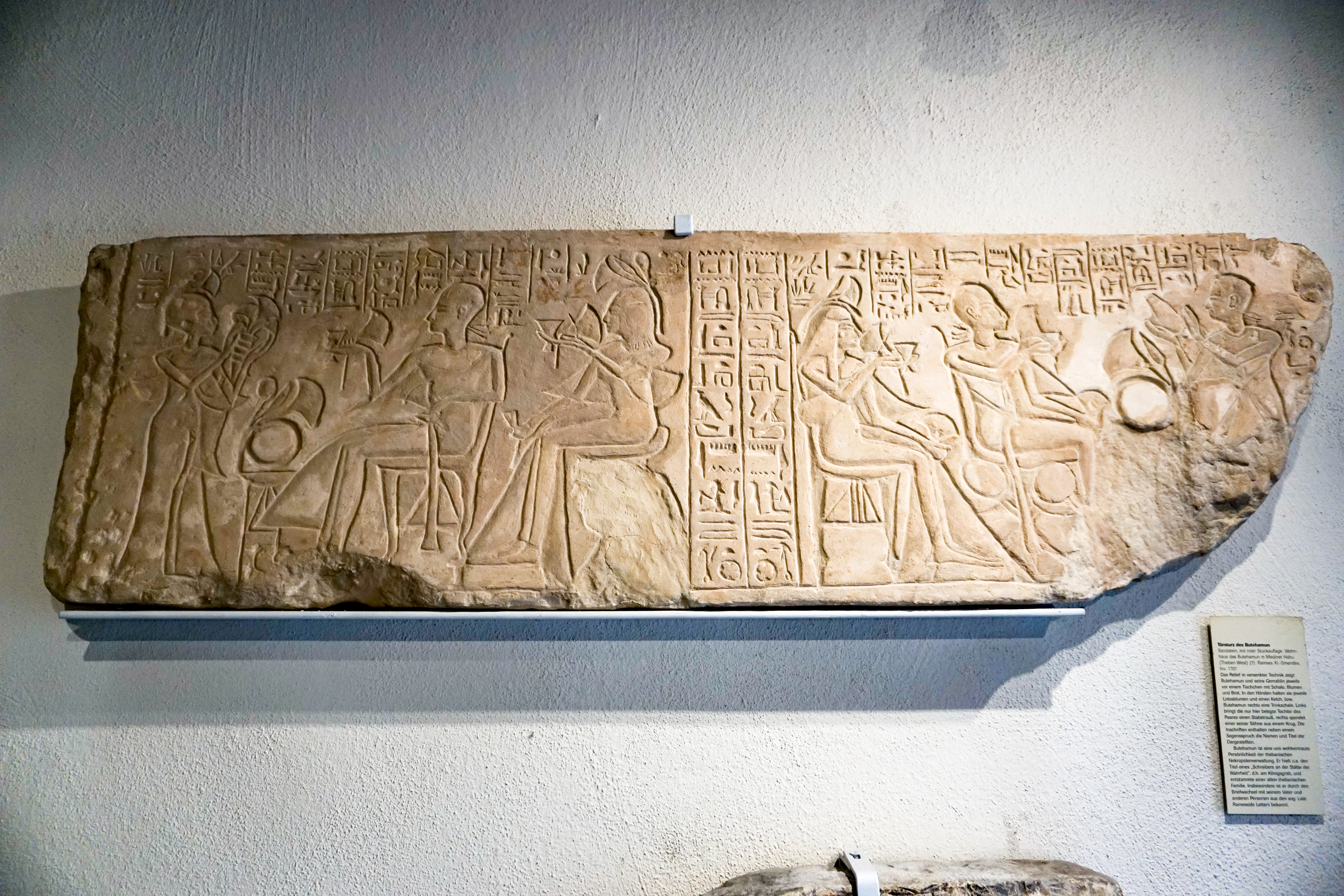
Door lintel of House of Butehamon, sandstone, with red stucco decoration

=== House of Butehamon ===
The remains of the residence of Butehamon (c. 1070 BC) were found in the outer court near the Western Fortified Gate of the mortuary temple. He was the son of Dhutmose and a royal scribe and overseer of the royal treasury in the Theban Necropolis in the 20th dynasty and into 21st dynasty, when the residence would have been built based on papyrus texts. Of the two surviving main rooms, one was square with a stone dais and four stuccoed sandstone columns with palm-leaf capitals. The columns had "inscriptions and scenes in which Amun-Re and the deified kings Amunhotep I and Ahmose-Nefretere are worshiped as the protecting deities of the Necropolis". Radiocarbon dating of a palm wood charcoal sample yielded the anomalous date of 1510 ± 40BC.

== Coptic settlement ==
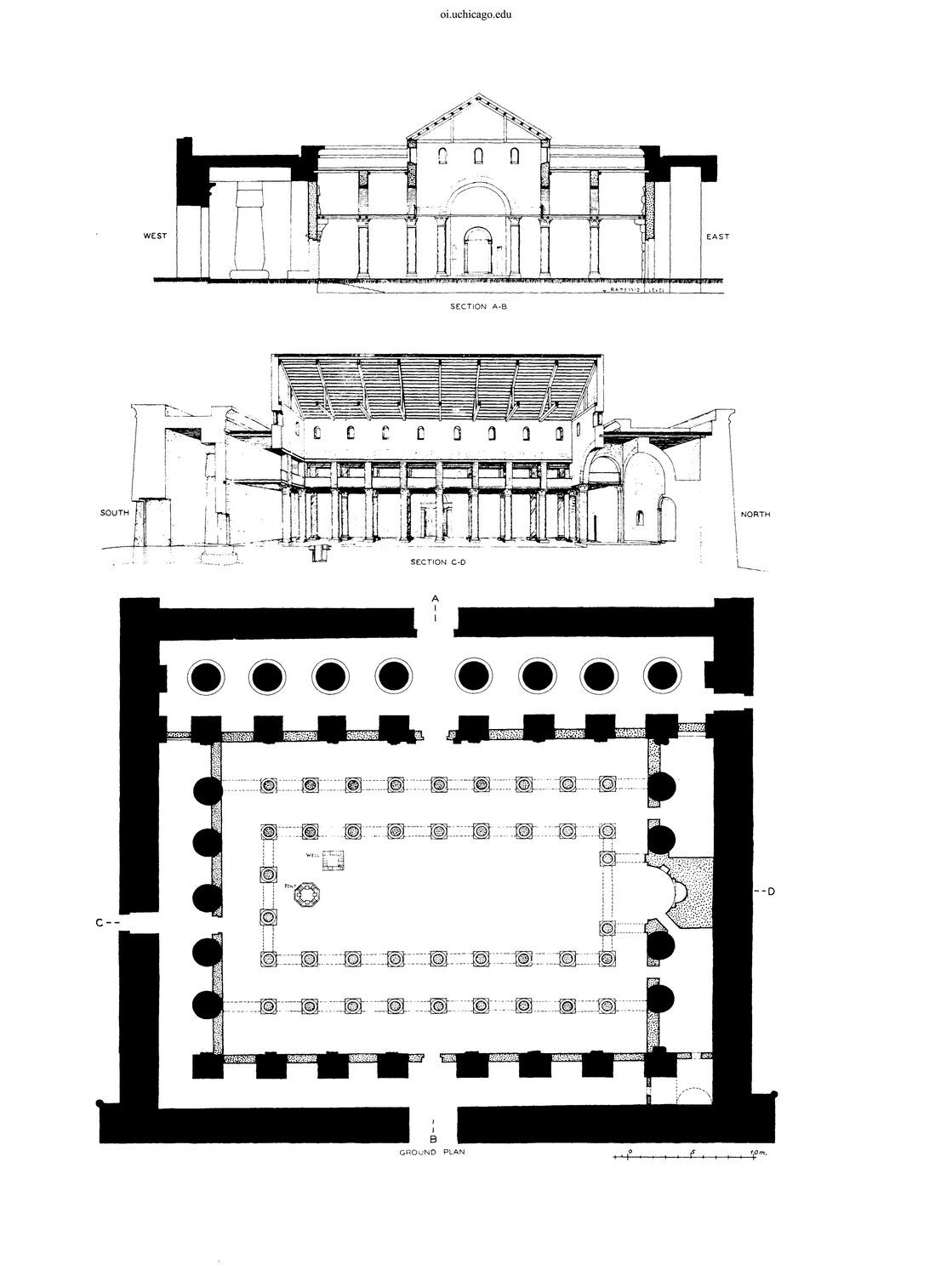
Great church in Medinet Habu before it was destroyed during the excavation

The Coptic settlement at Medinet Habu was established as the final stage of a continuous process of occupation of the mortuary complex of Ramses III, which began in pharaonic times and continued into the Roman and late antique period. The settlement was a densely populated town with an estimated population of 18,860 residents, which was installed in various inner sectors, including the temple itself. The settlement pattern matched that of the Karnak and Luxor temples, with large blocks of houses separated by narrow streets and religious buildings as important focal points of the urban texture.

Several churches were built in different sectors of the mortuary temple, including the great five-aisled basilica known as the "Holy Church of Djeme", which was located in the second court of Ramses III's temple. The church had a north–south orientation cutting across the original axis of the temple and was provided with a font and a well, placed at the southern end of the central nave. The church was dated between the 5th and the 7th century by Monneret de Villard, while Grossmann suggested an attribution to the middle or second half of the 6th century.

Before the clearing of the temple at the end of the 19th century, much of the Coptic town was still visible as it was left after its abandonment in the 9th century. The settlement's religious buildings, including the Holy Church of Djeme, were damaged over time, with one of the Ramesside columns on the east side removed to accommodate the apse and the Osiris pillars cut away since they were inappropriate in a Christian building. Sparse graffiti and damage are all that remain after the removal of the church in modern times.

== Gallery ==
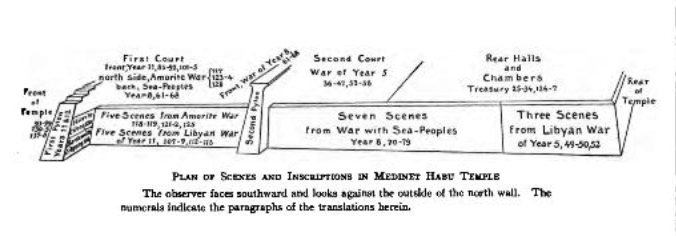
Sketch of the inscriptions on the northeast wall at the temple, by James Henry Breasted

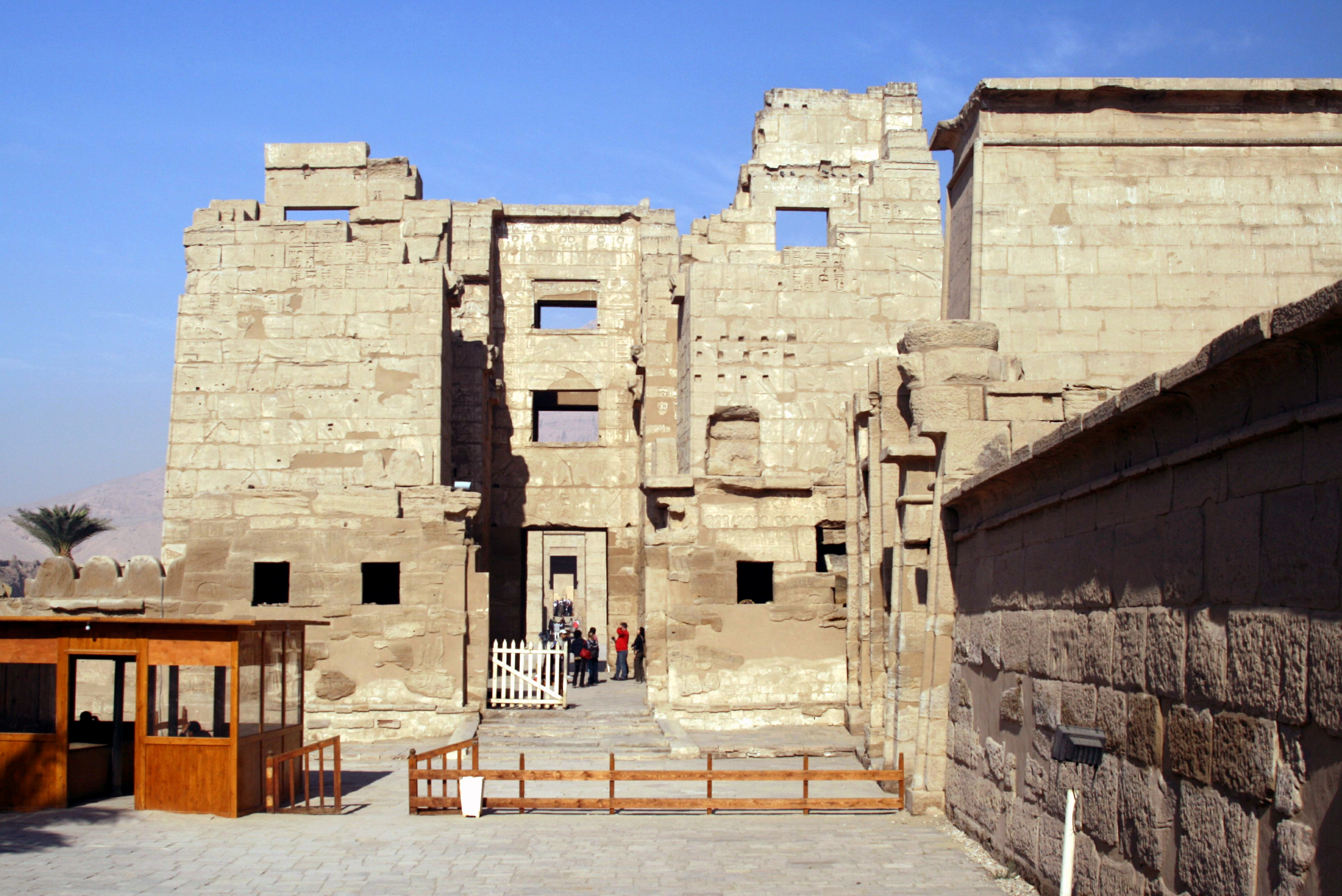
Migdol entrance to Medinet Habu from the south-east

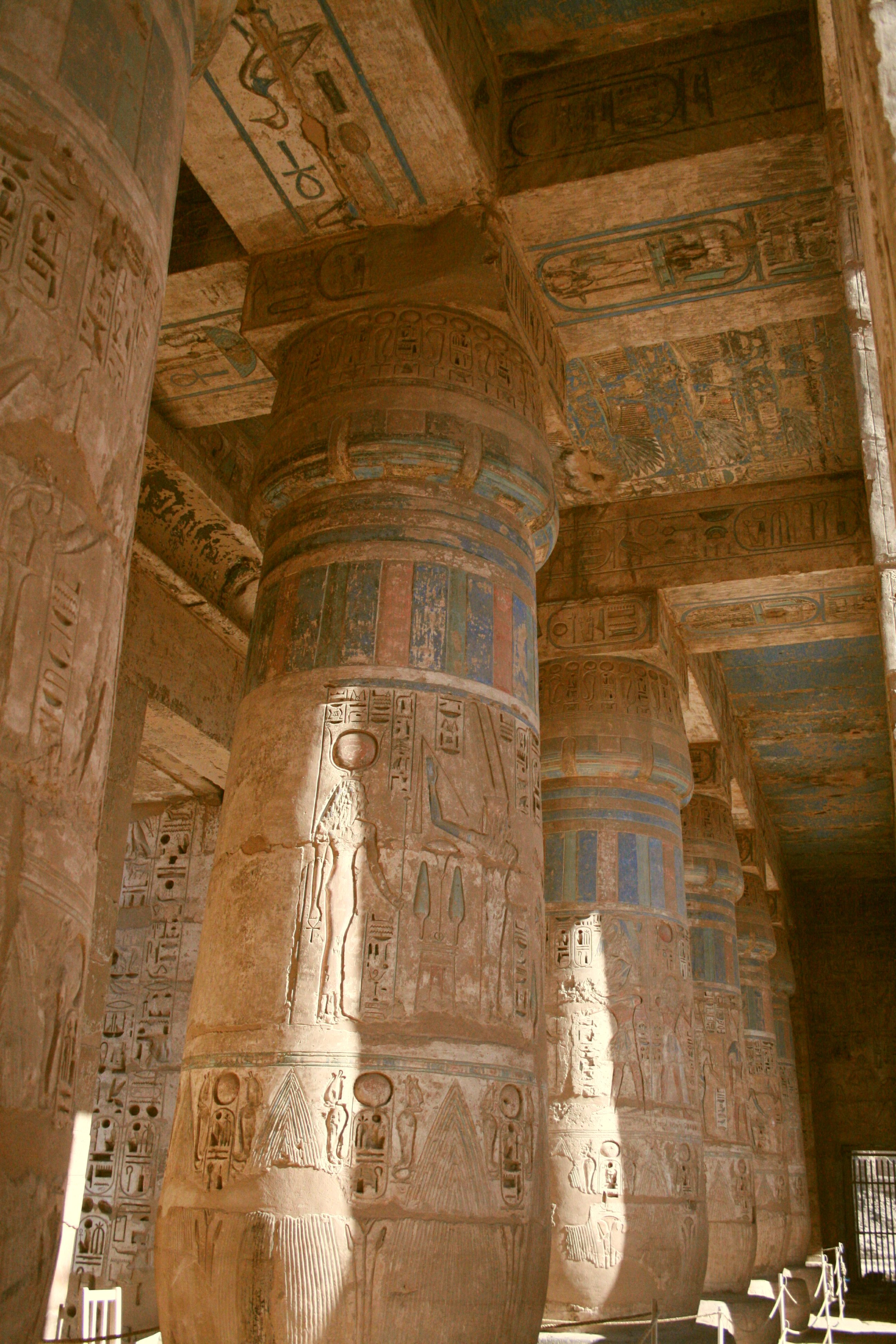
Ceiling decoration in the peristyle hall

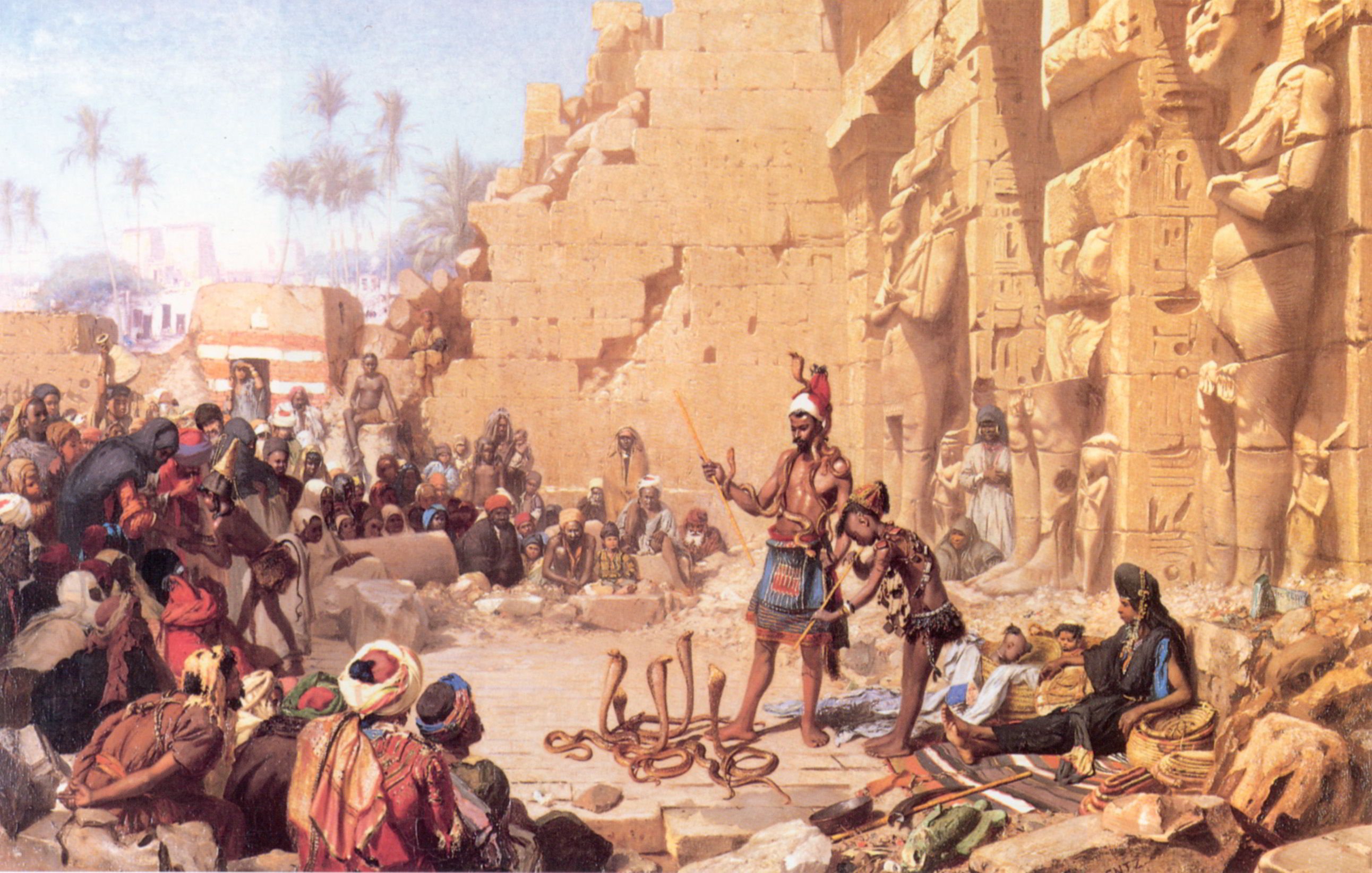
1872 orientalist painting by Wilhelm Gentz, set in the peristyle court

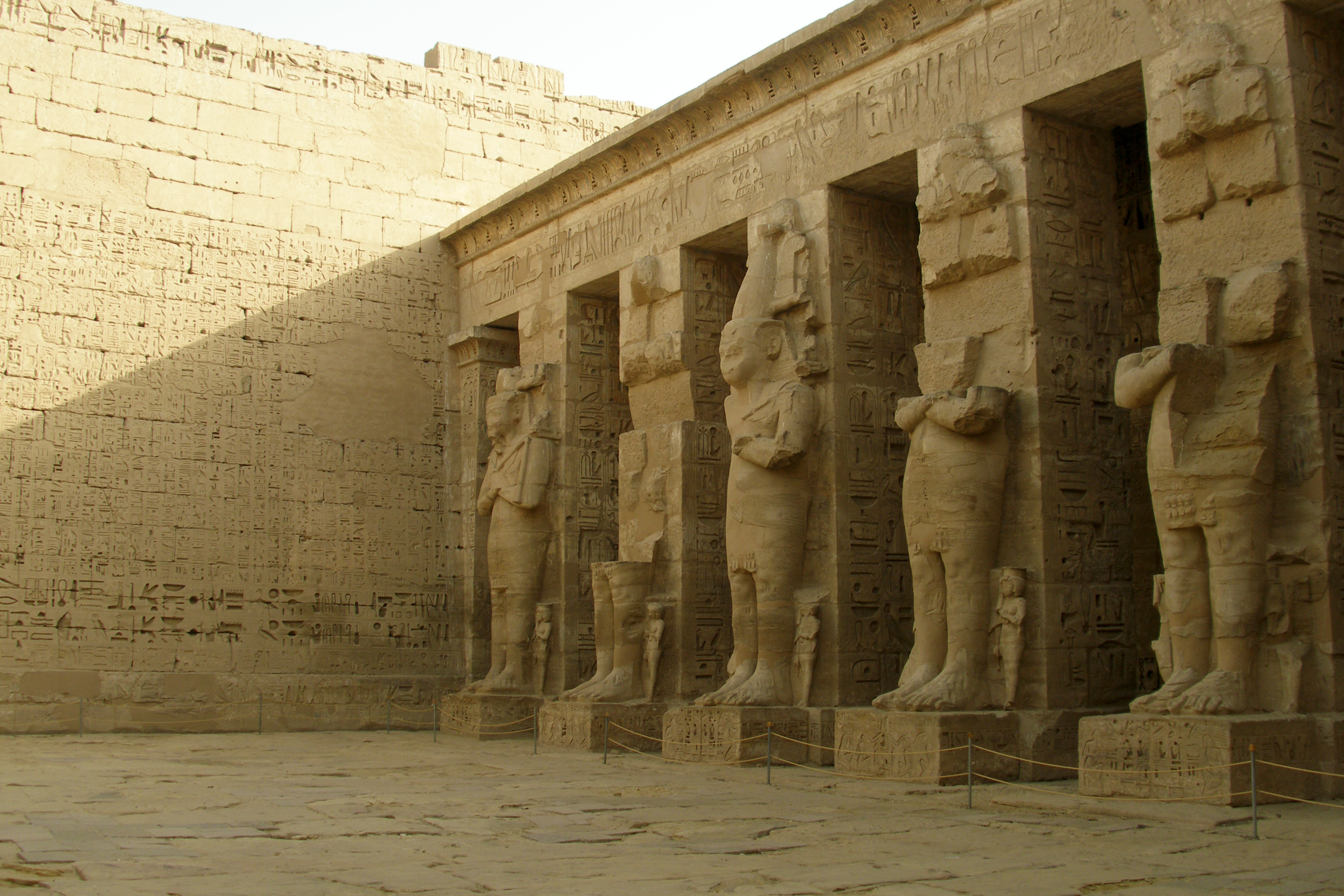
Ramesside columns in the peristyle court (first courtyard)

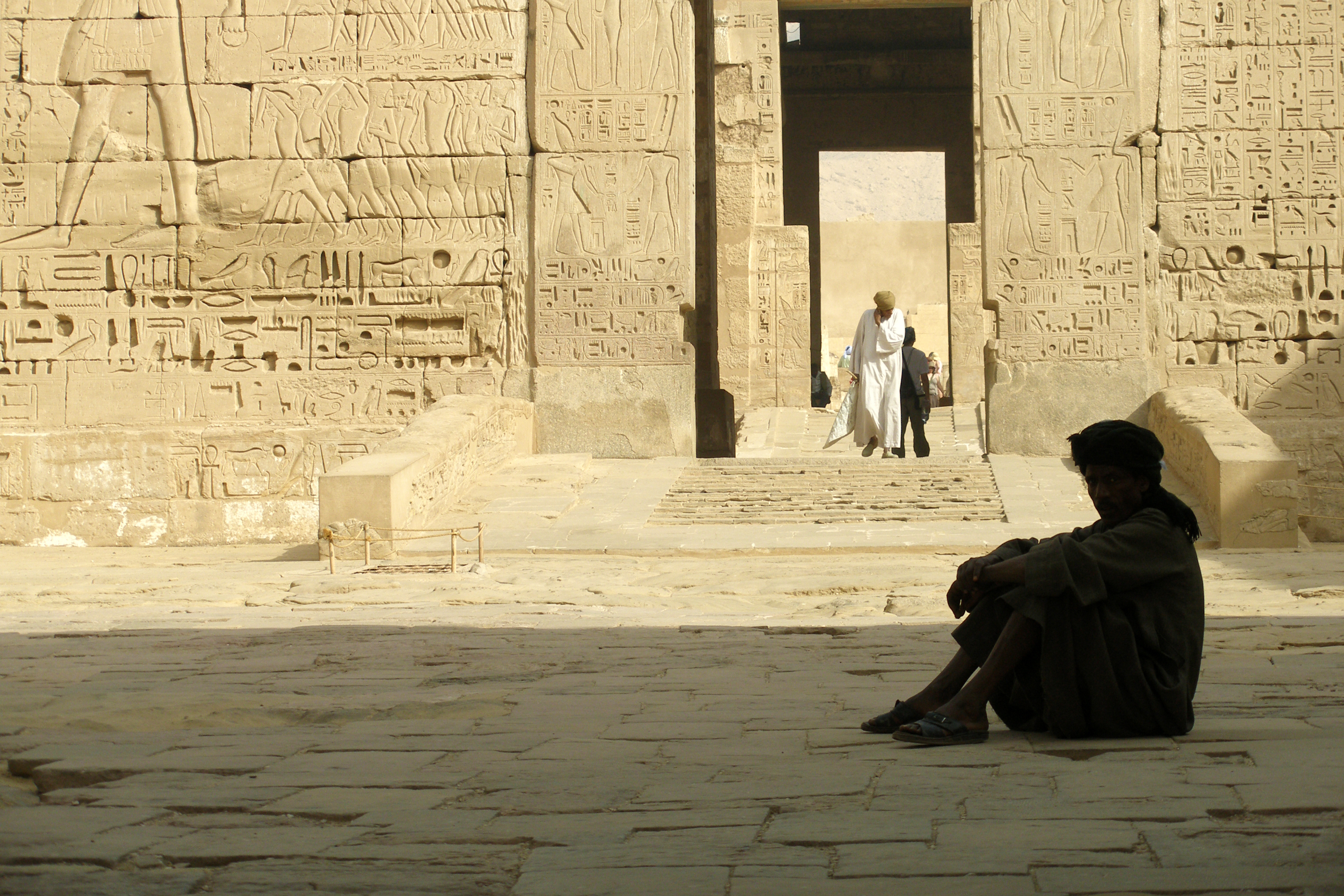
First courtyard and second pylon from inside

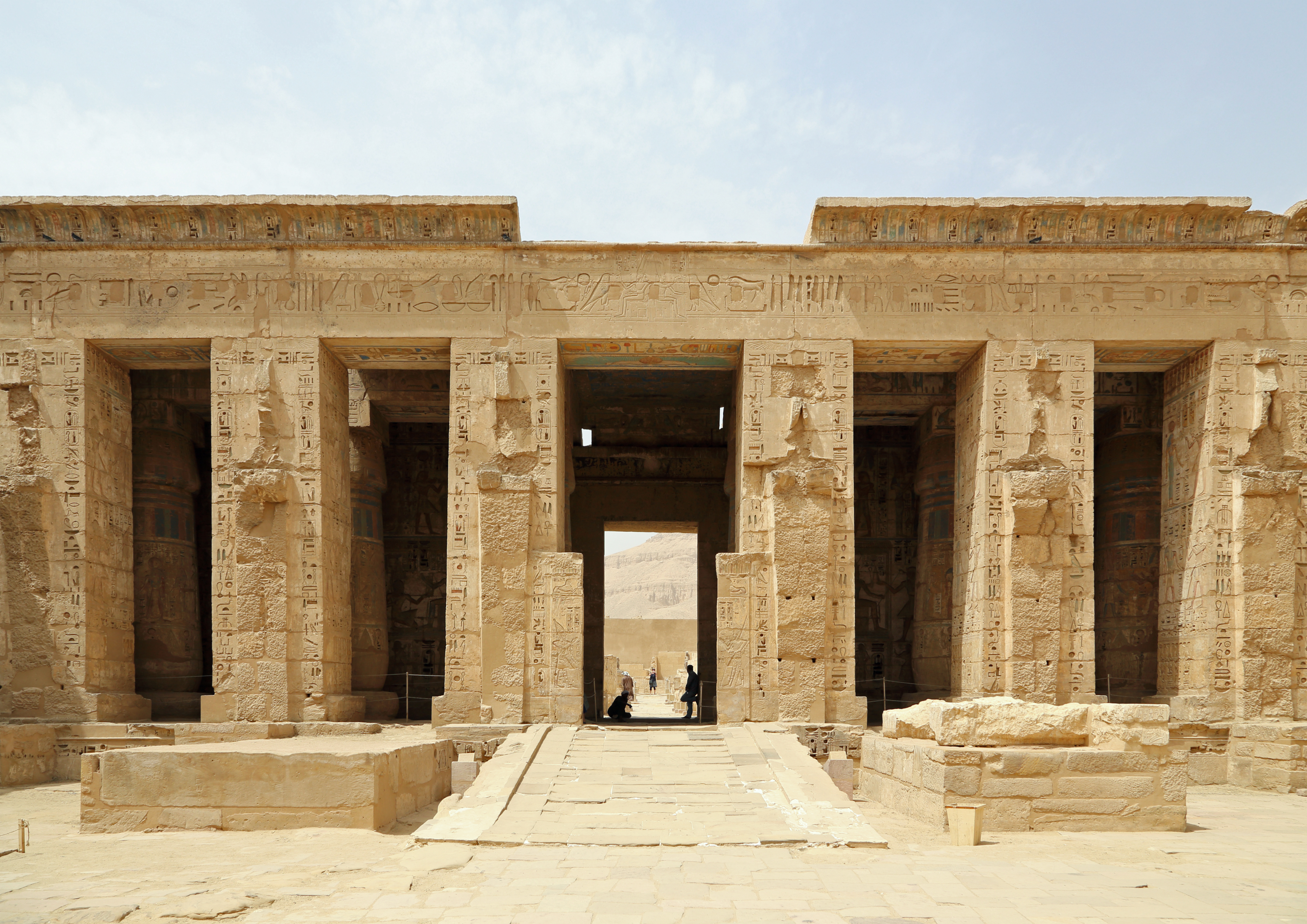
Second courtyard and the facade of the peristyle hall

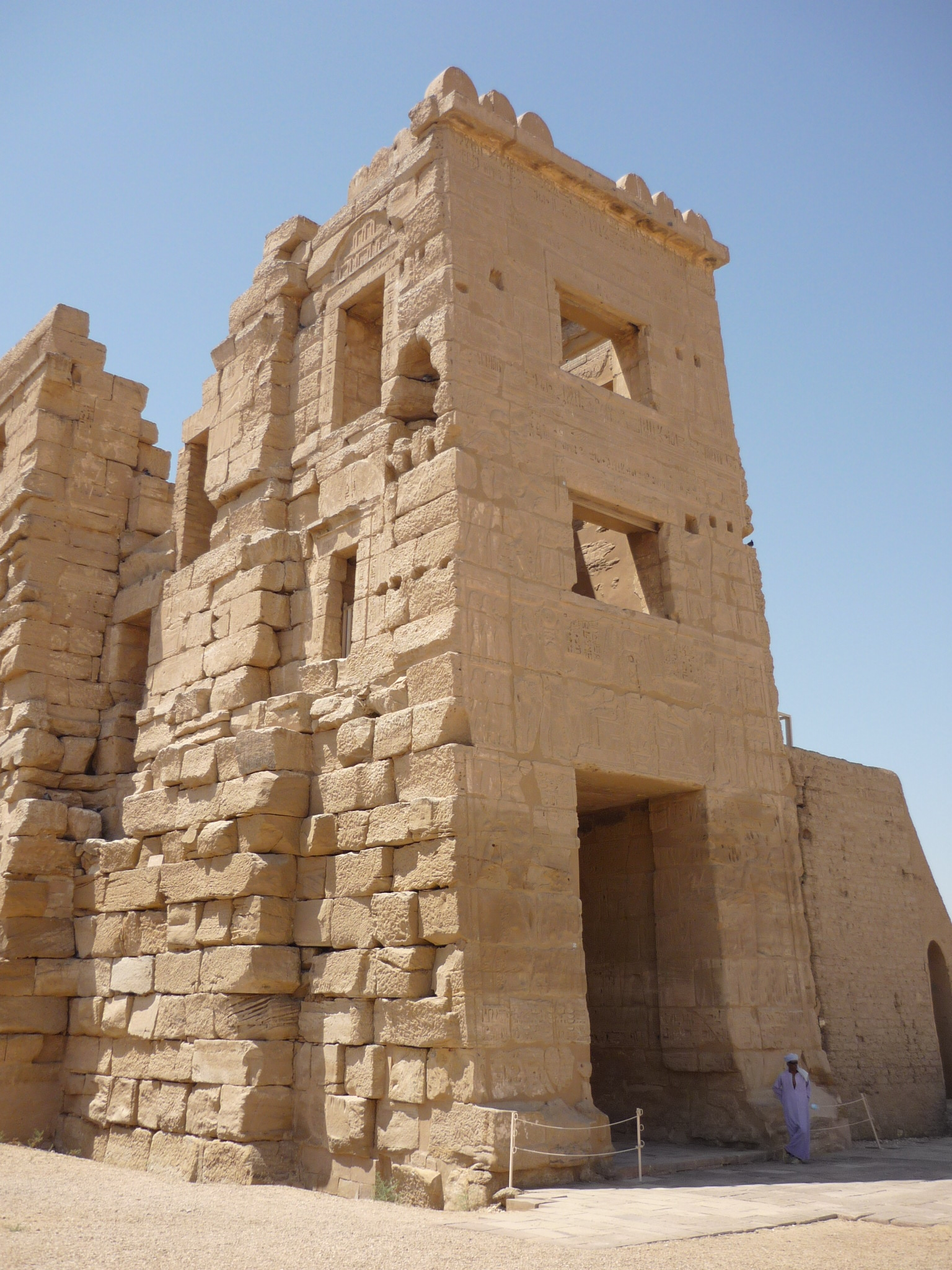
Fortified entrance gate seen from the north

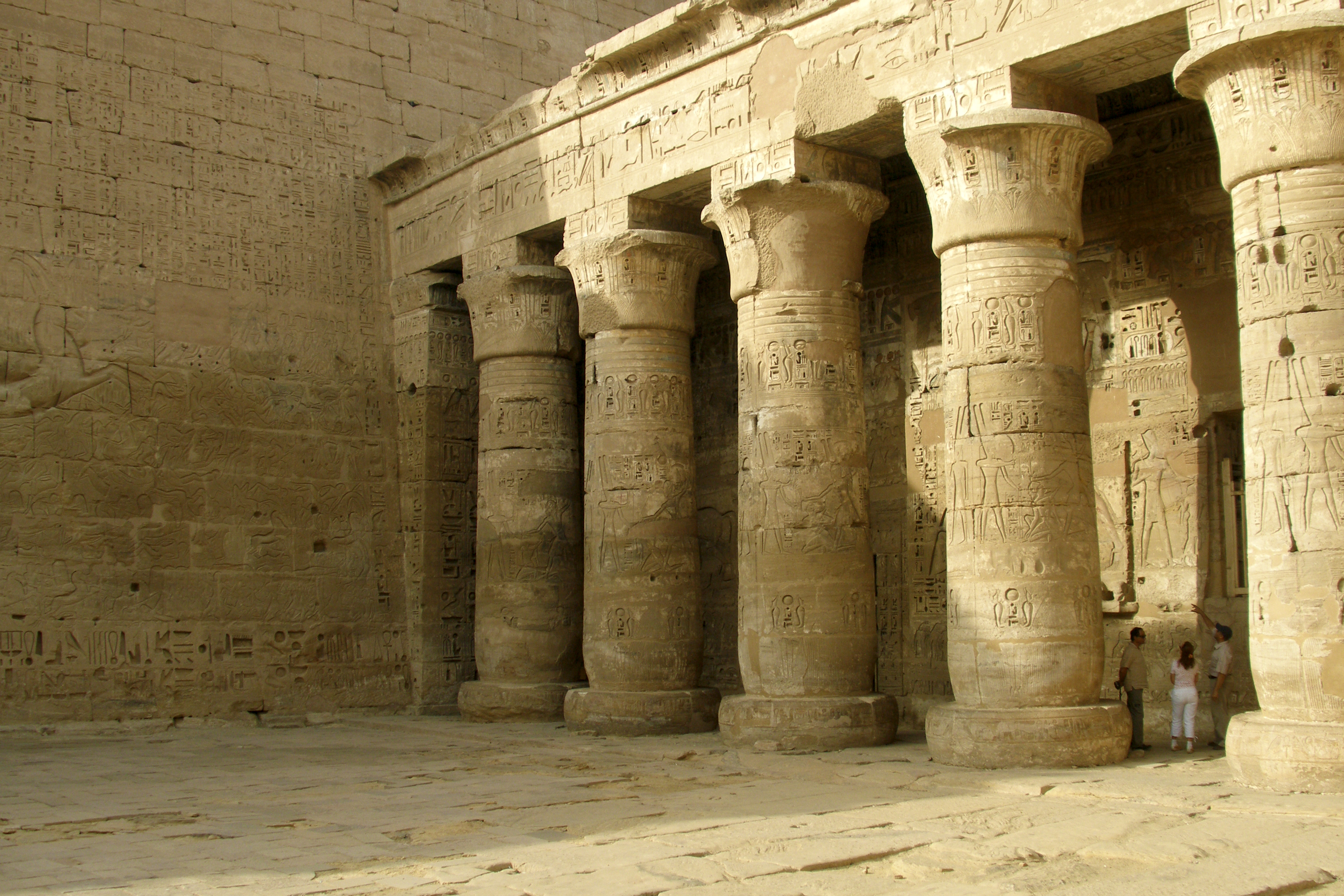
Columns in the First Courtyard

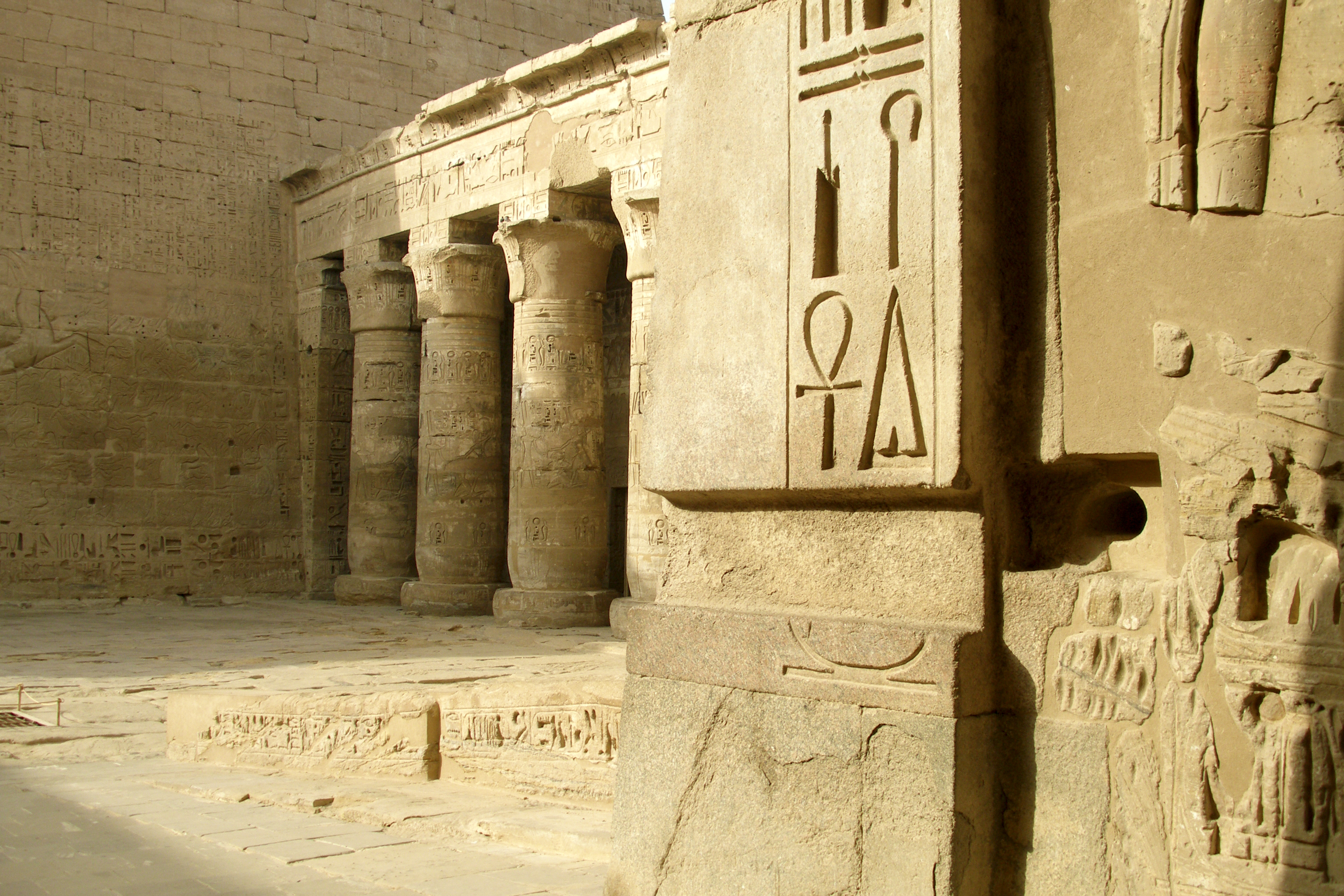
Reliefs, Egyptian hieroglyphs art

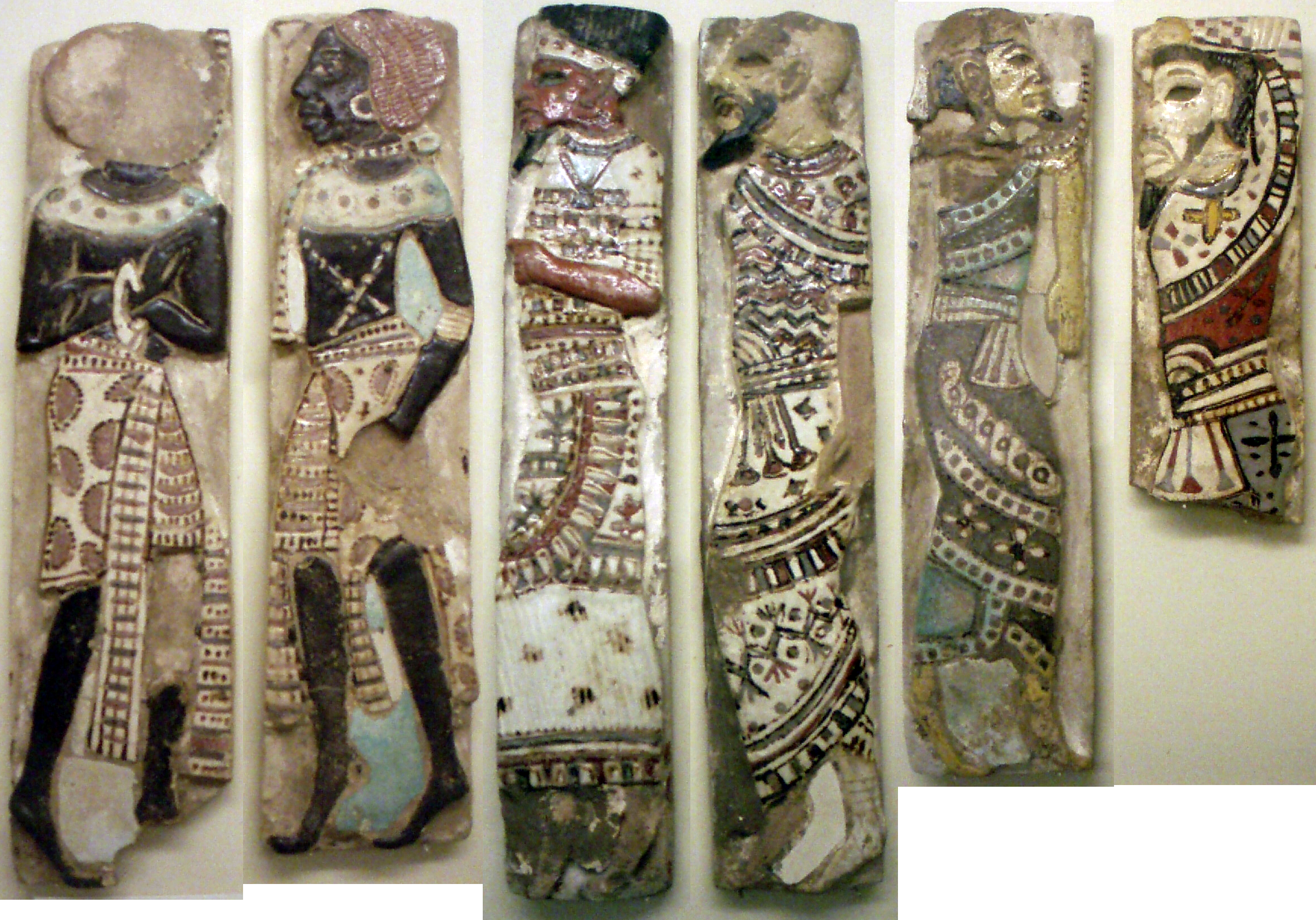
Ramesses III prisoner tiles: Glass and faience inlays from Rameses III palace

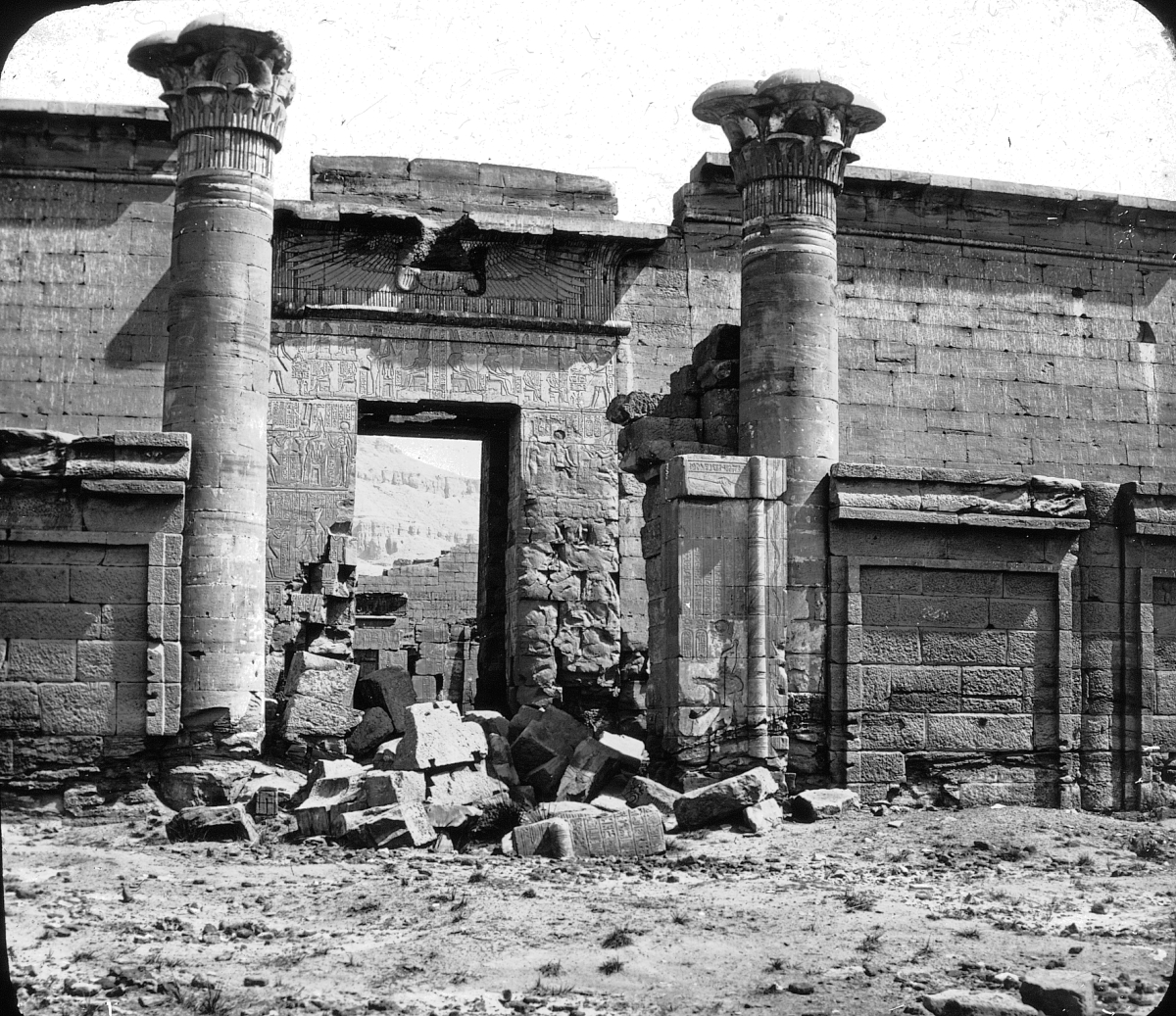
Egypt - Medinet Habu, Thebes. Brooklyn Museum Archives, Goodyear Archival Collection

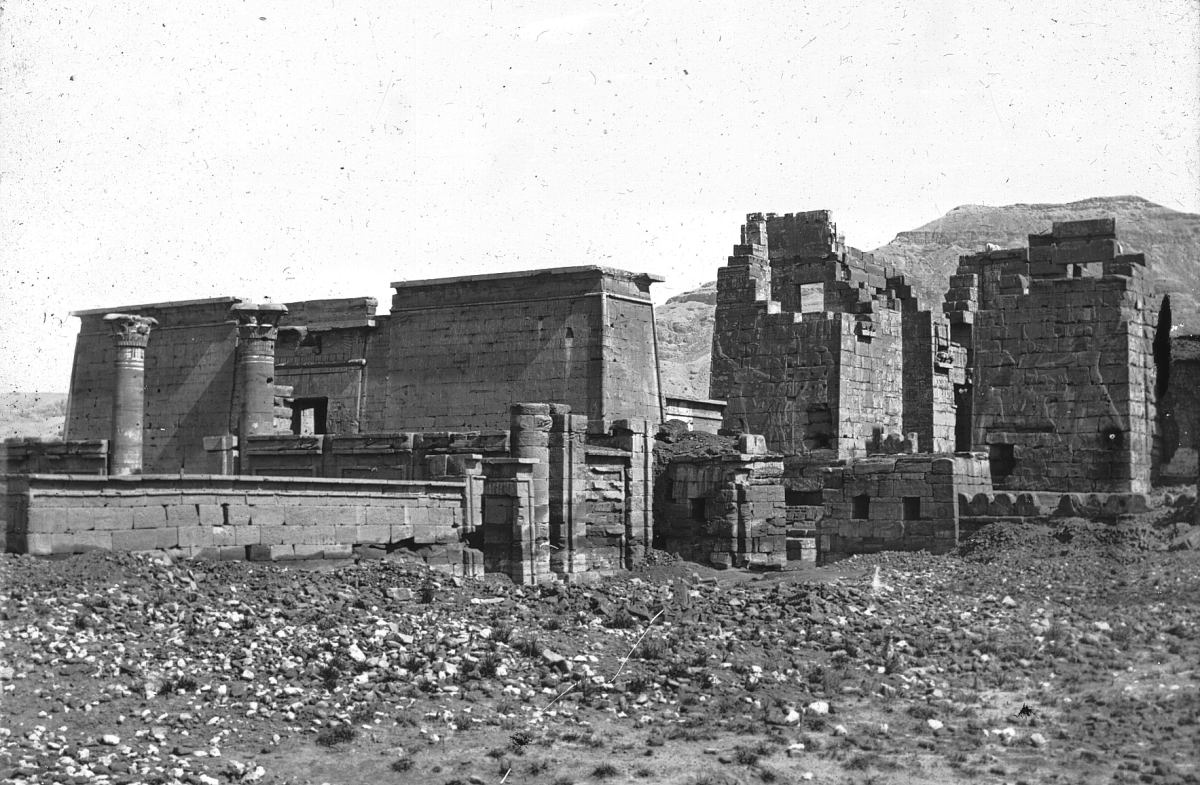
Egypt - Pavilion of Rameses III, Thebes. Brooklyn Museum Archives, Goodyear Archival Collection

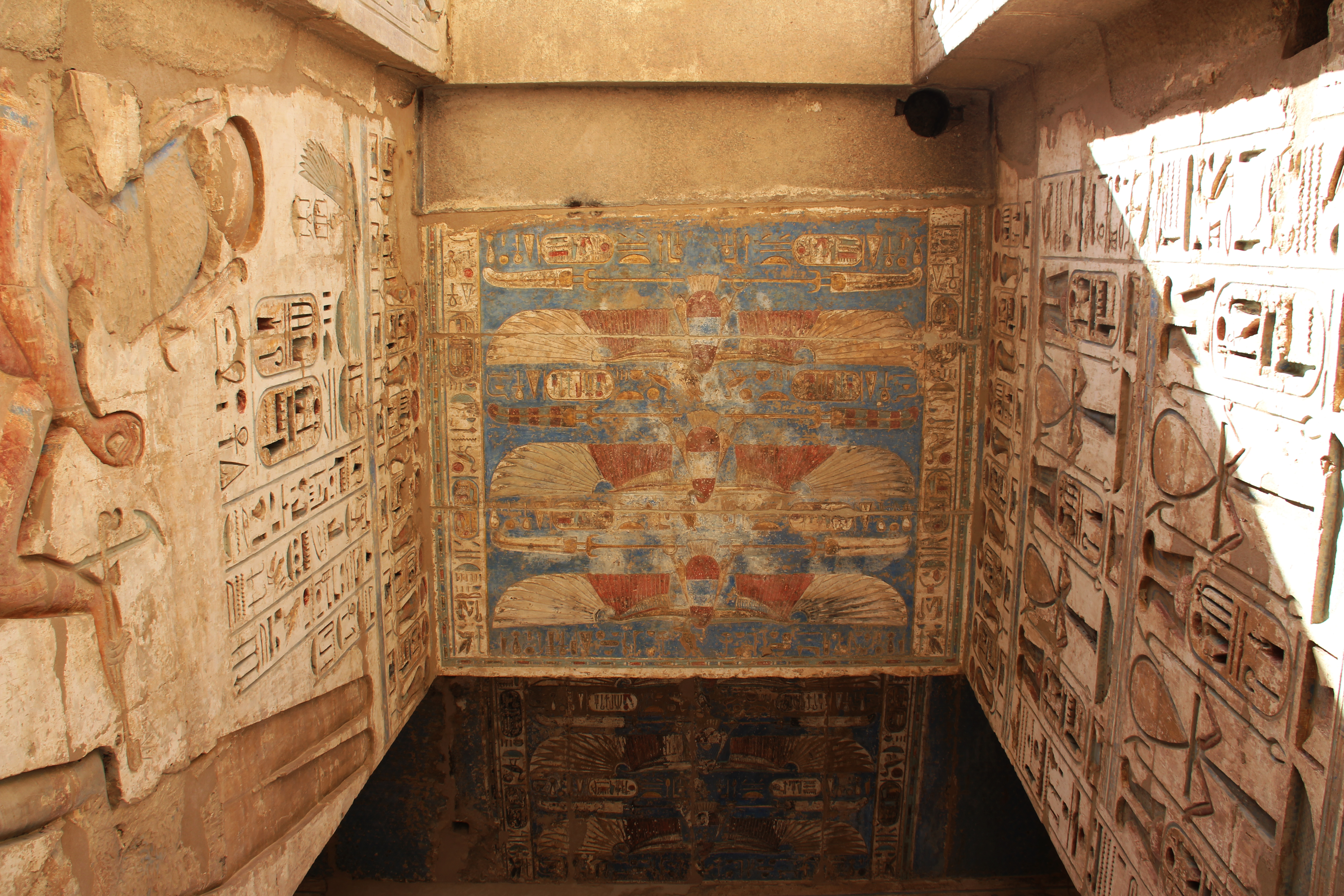
Medinet Habu Temple ceiling

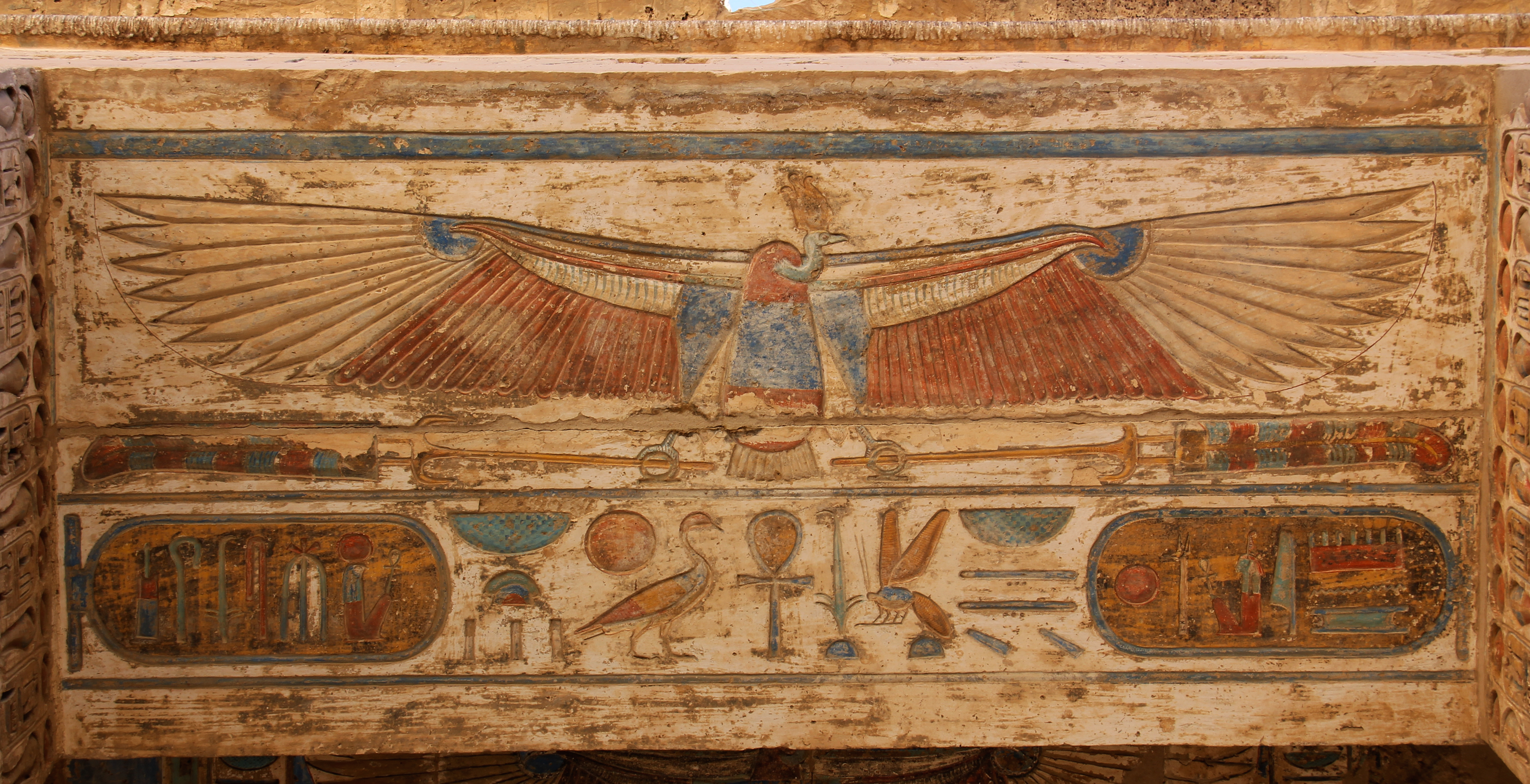
Medinet Habu Temple ceiling

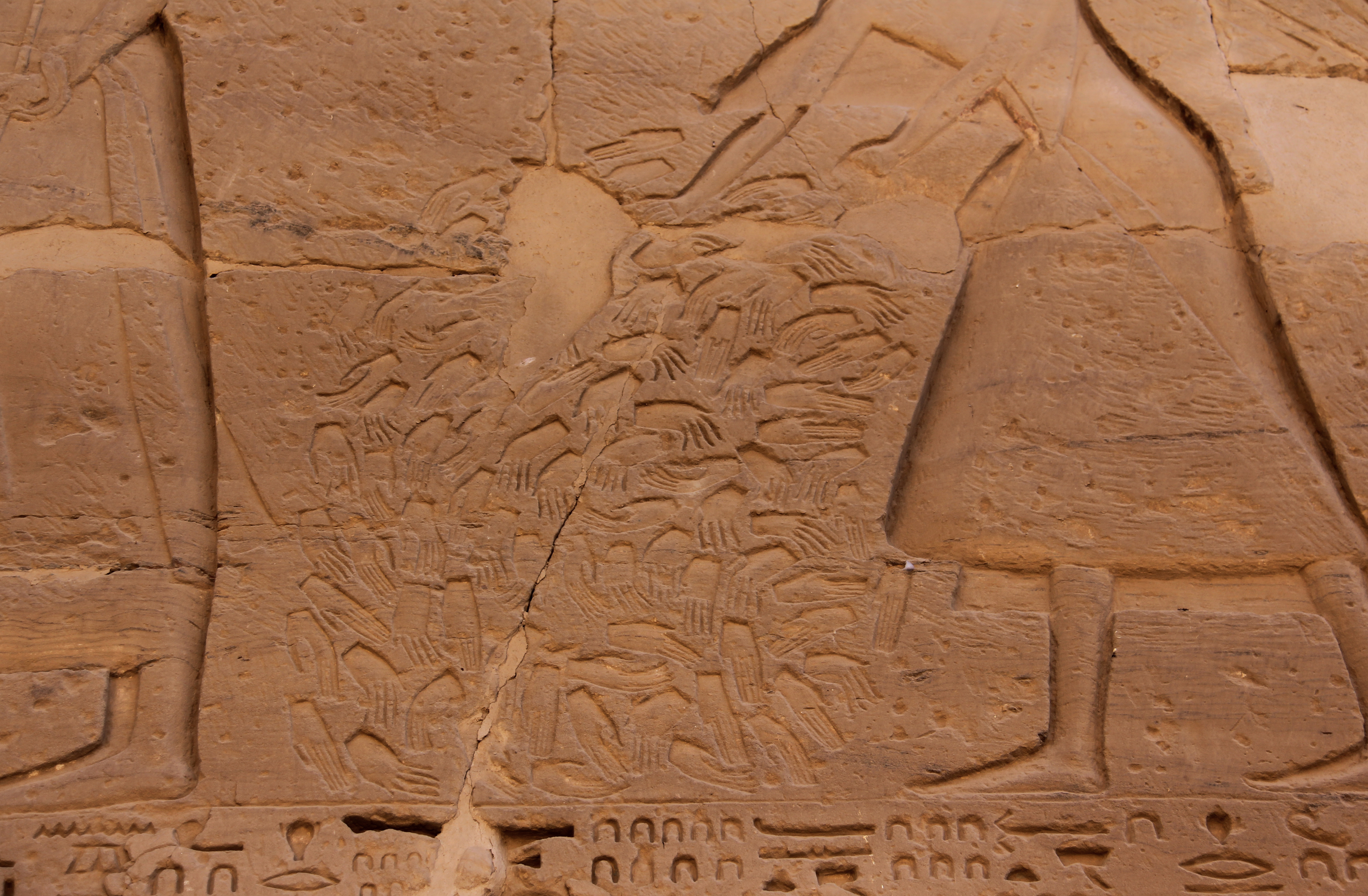
Medinet Habu Temple. Piles of hands, an accounting method of determining how many killed in battle

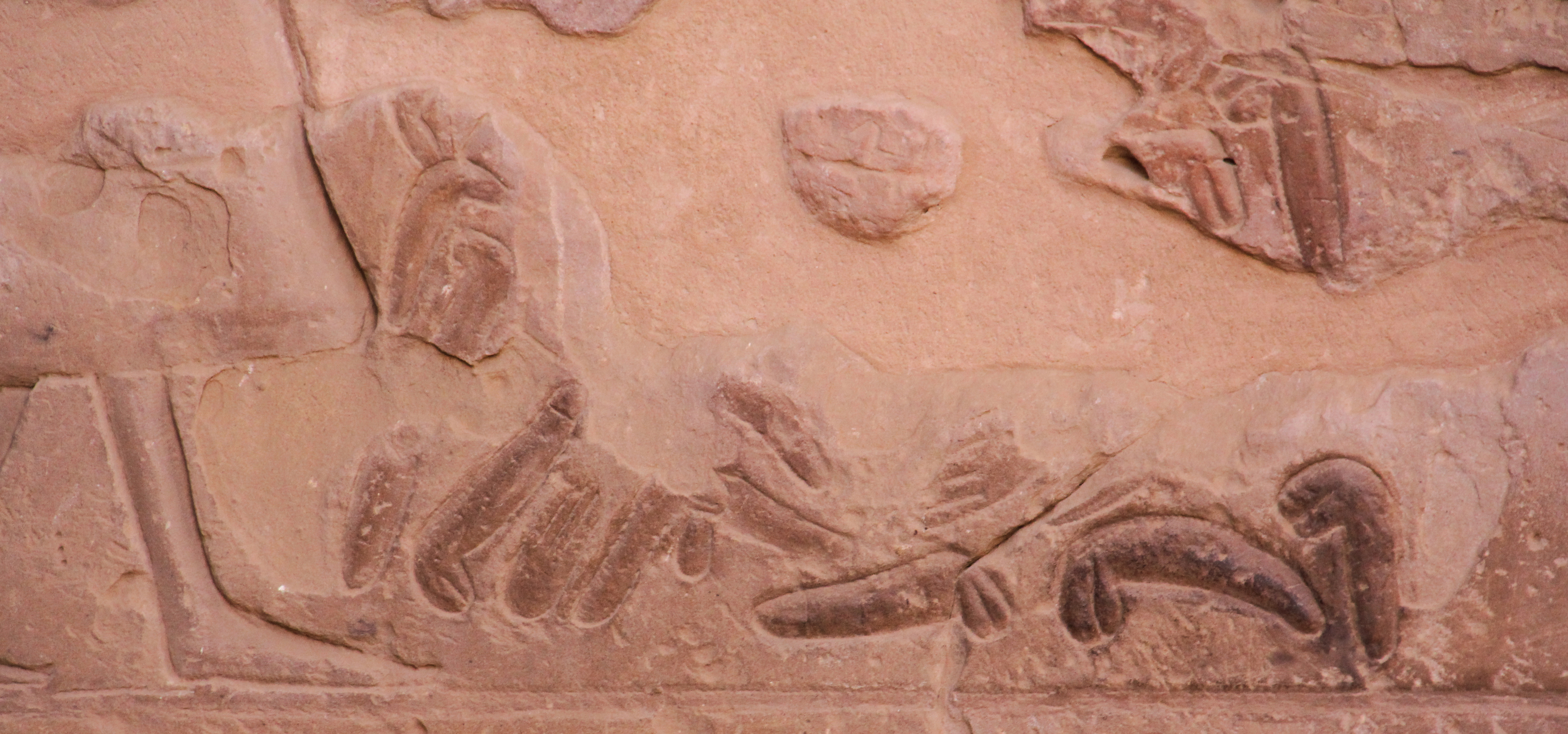
Medinet Habu Temple. Piles of genitals, an accounting method of determining how many killed in battle

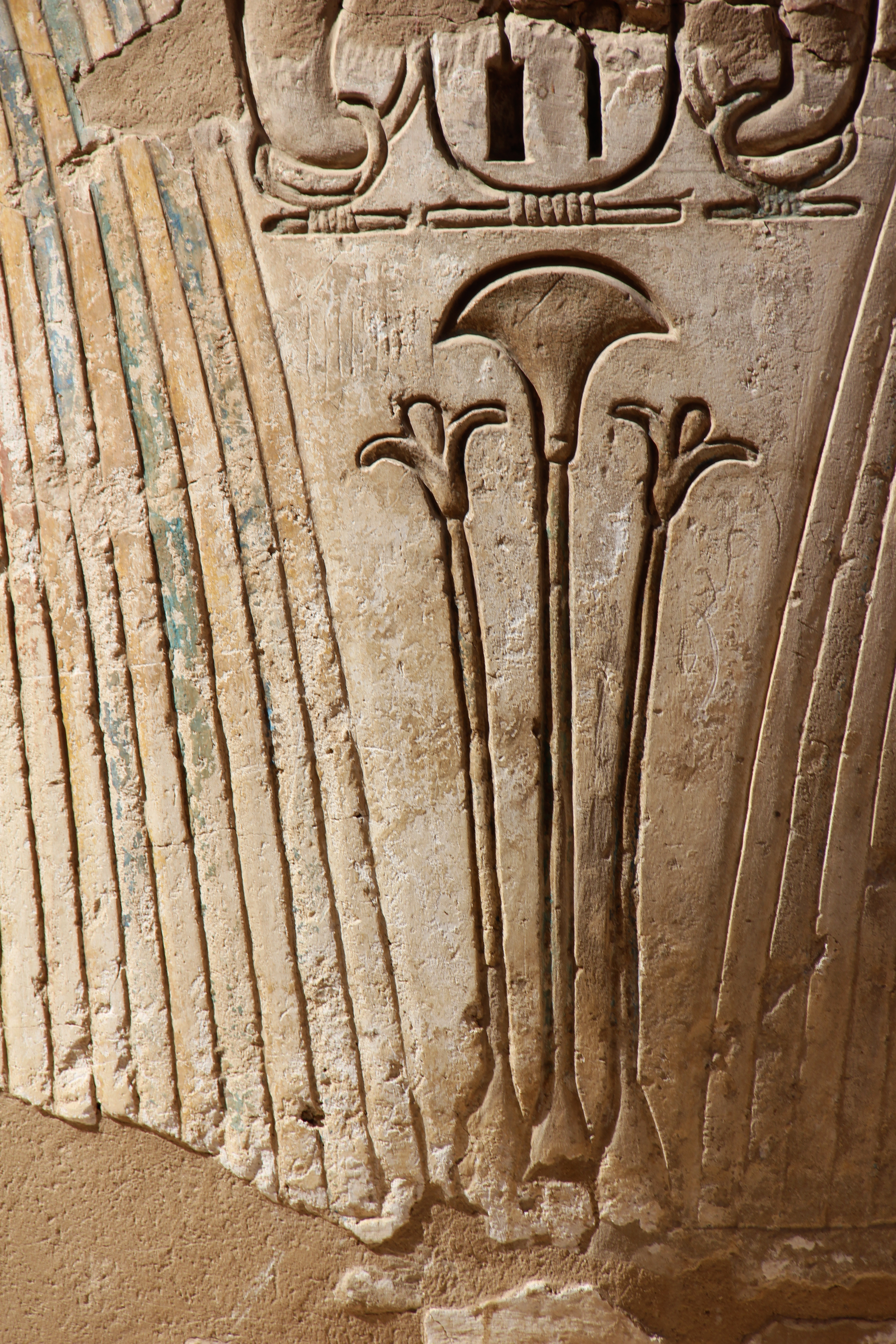
Medinet Habu Temple. Column detail

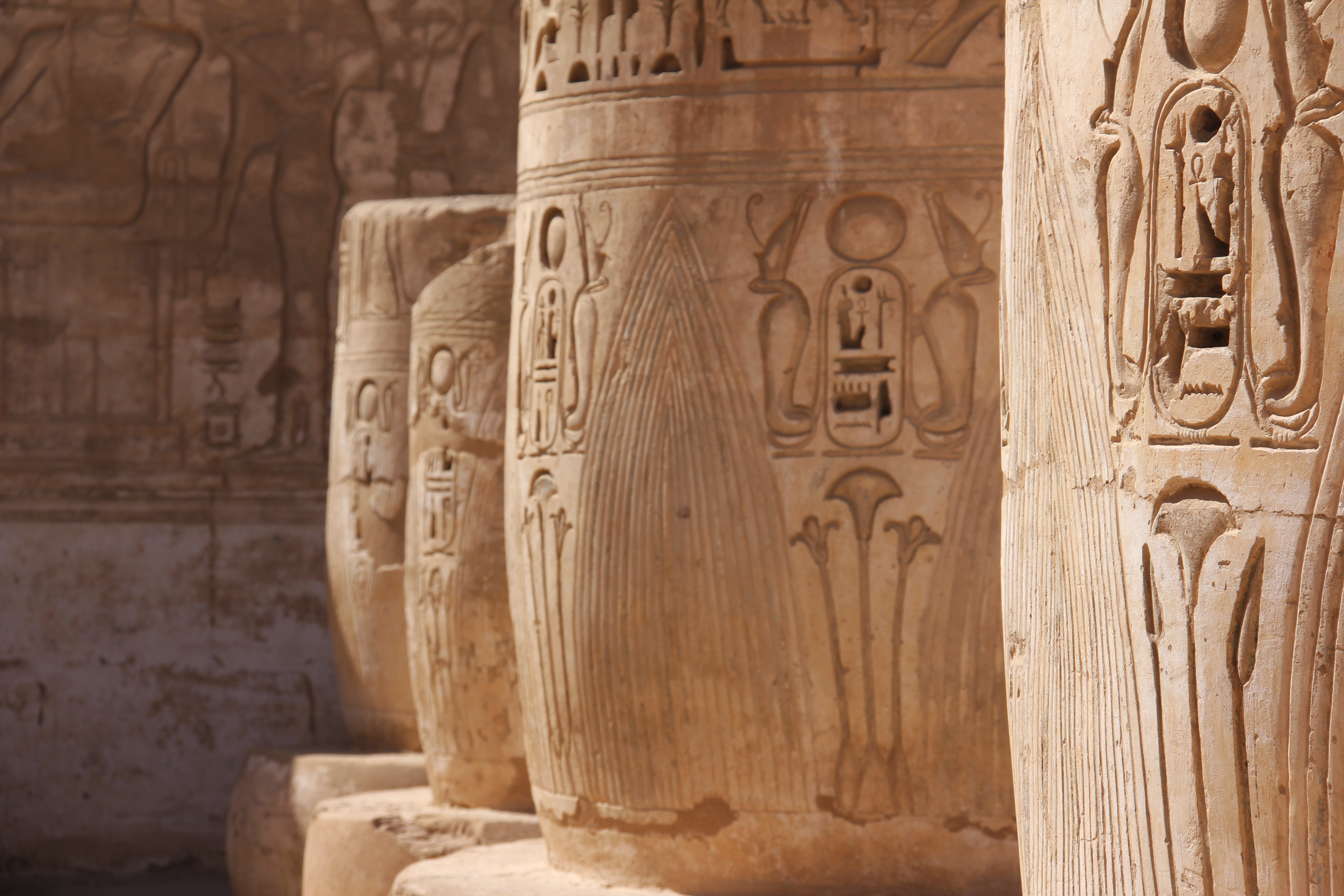
Column detail from the grand hypostyle hall

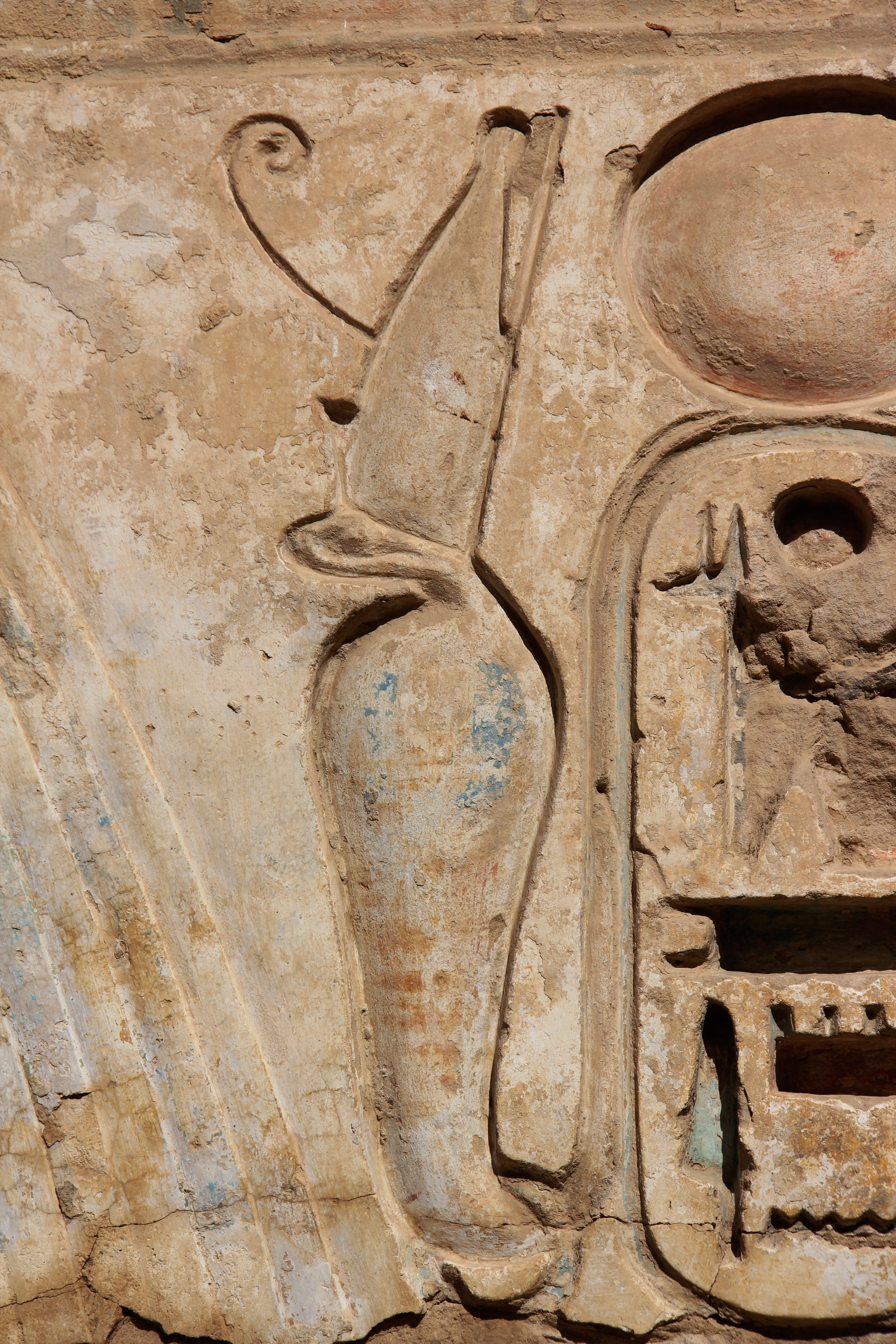
Medinet Habu Temple. Column detail

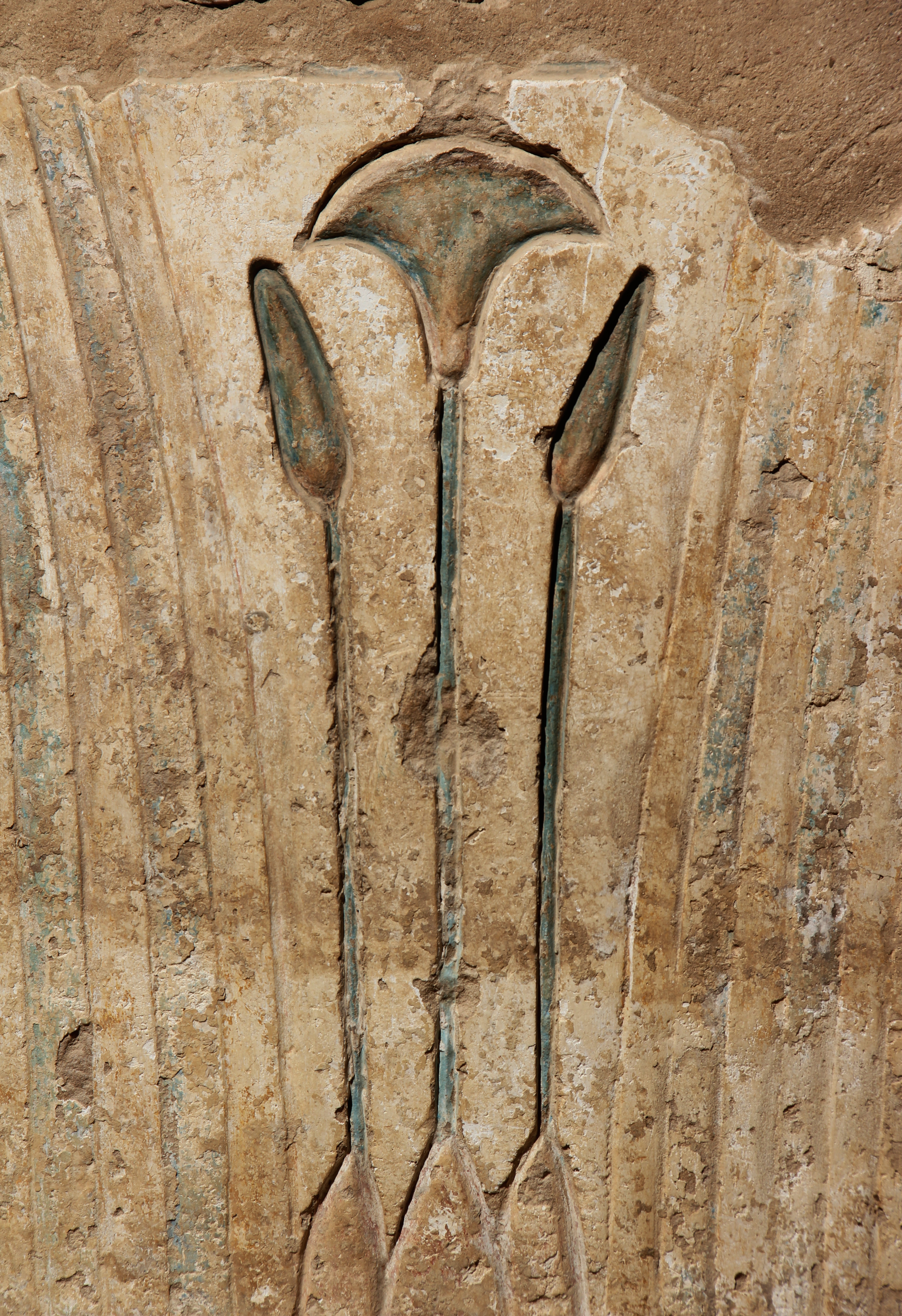
Medinet Habu Temple. Column detail

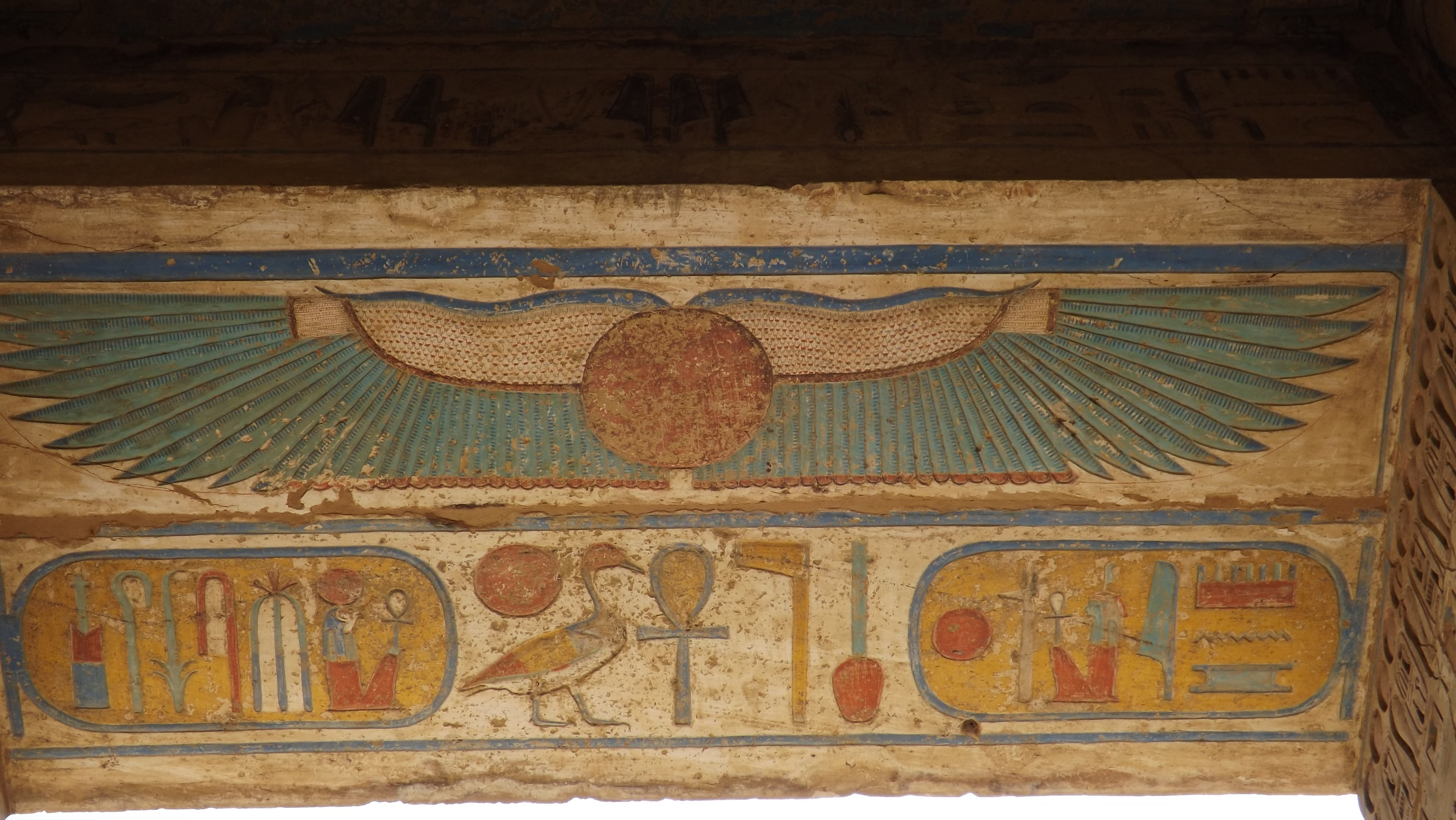
Habu Temple scene showing colors.

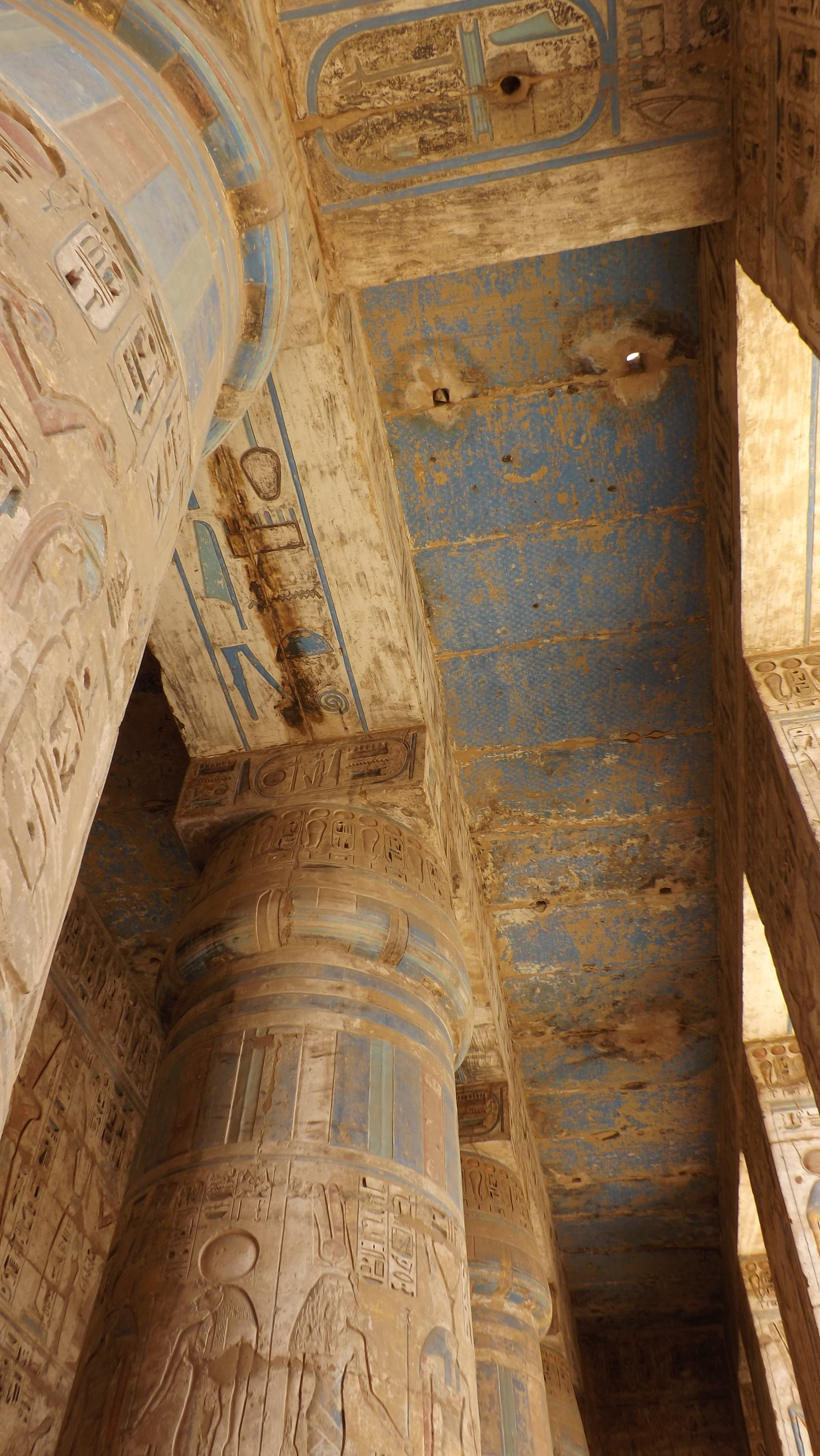
Foor details, first hypostyle hall.

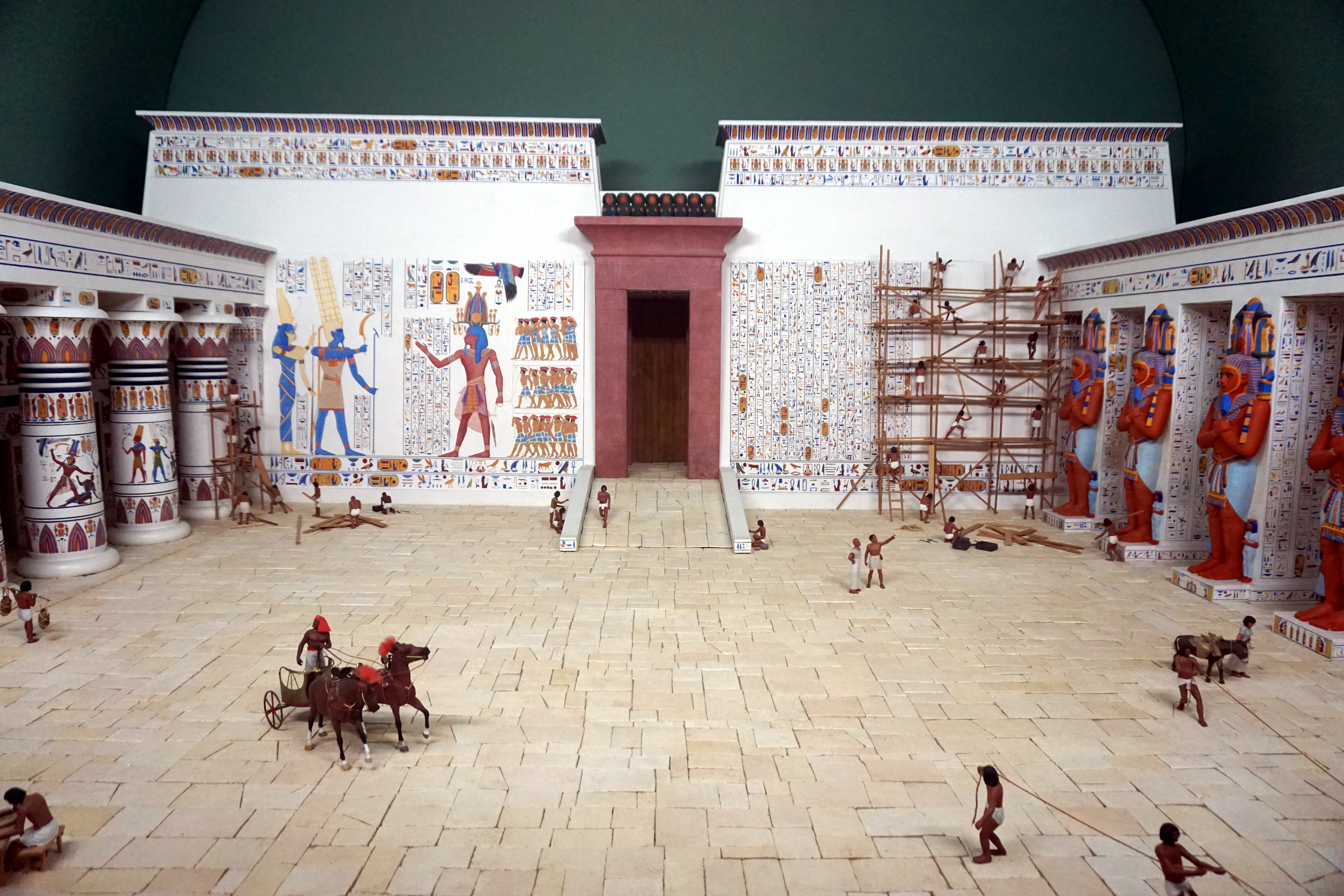
Scale model at the Milwaukee Public Museum

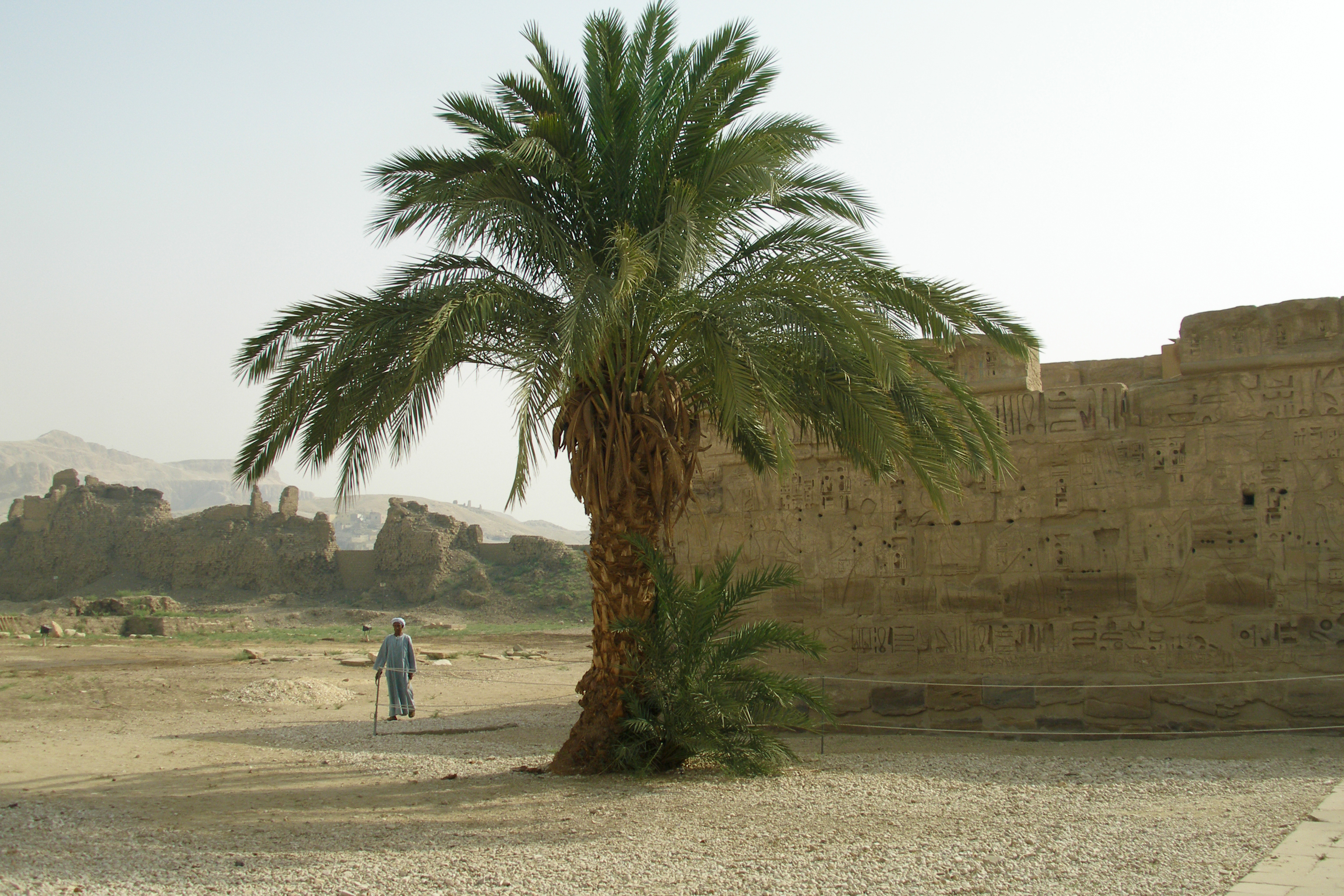
Medinet Habu grounds

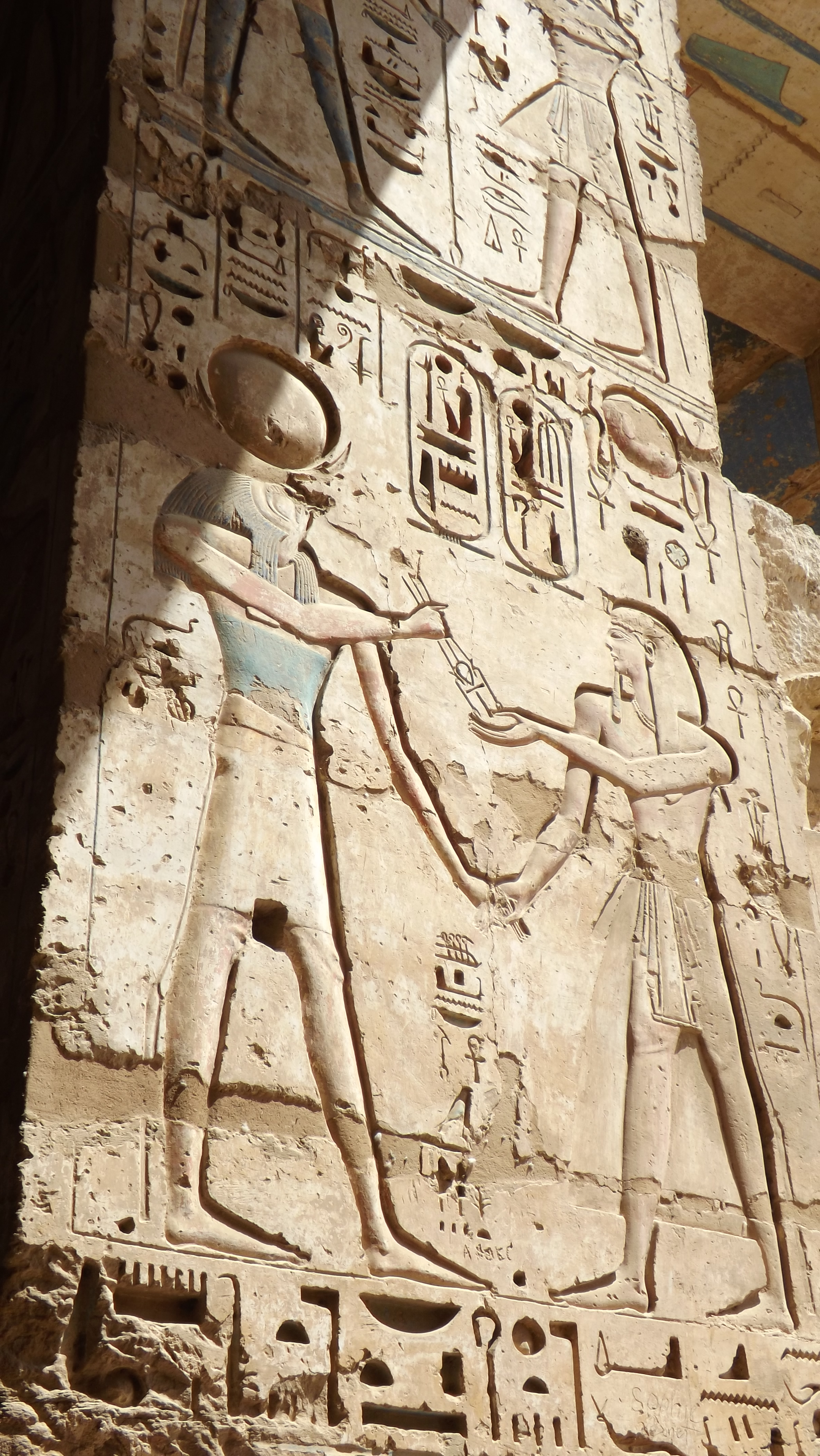
Habu Temple scene. The god Khonsu gives Pharaoh an ankh, representing life.

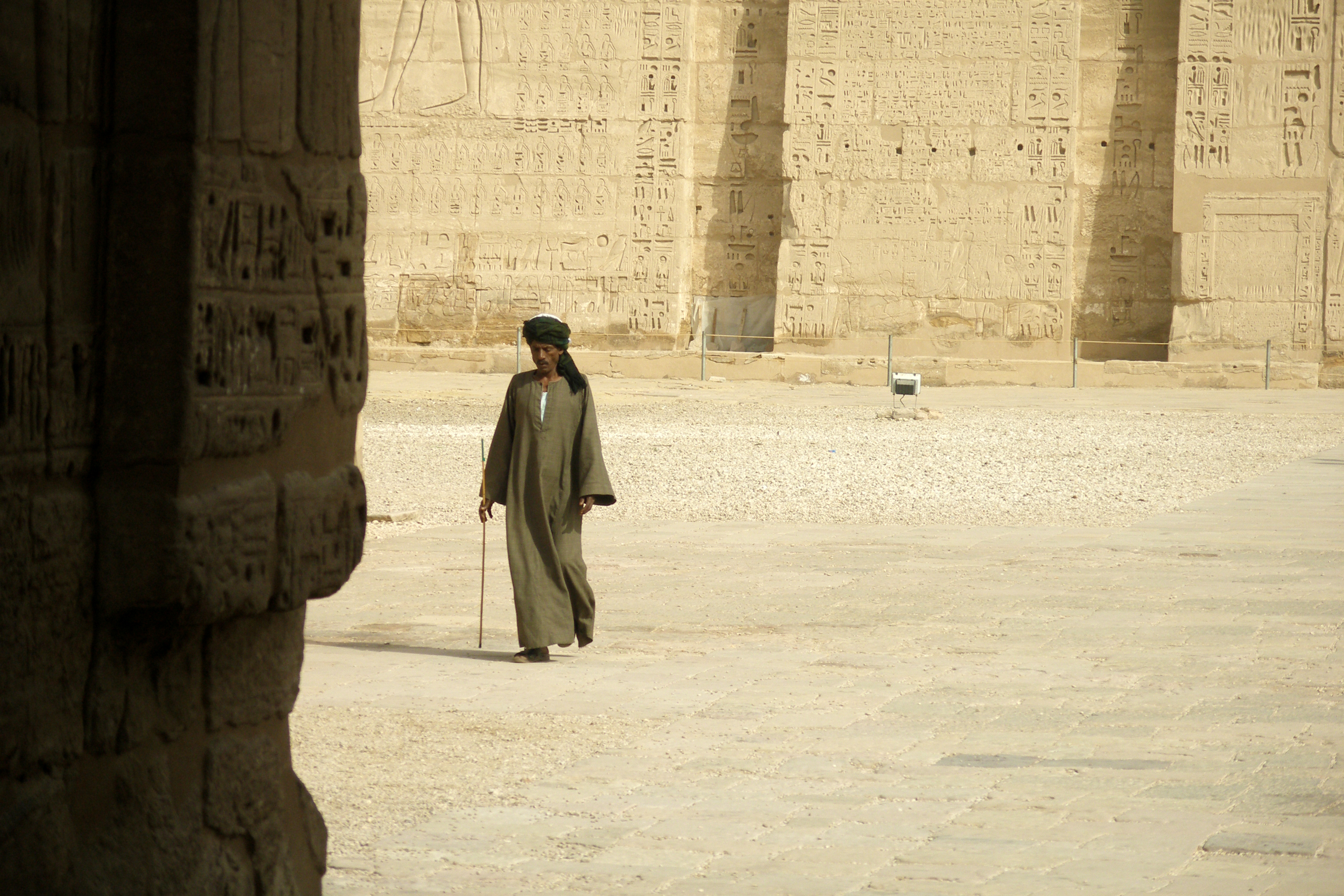
Temple entrance

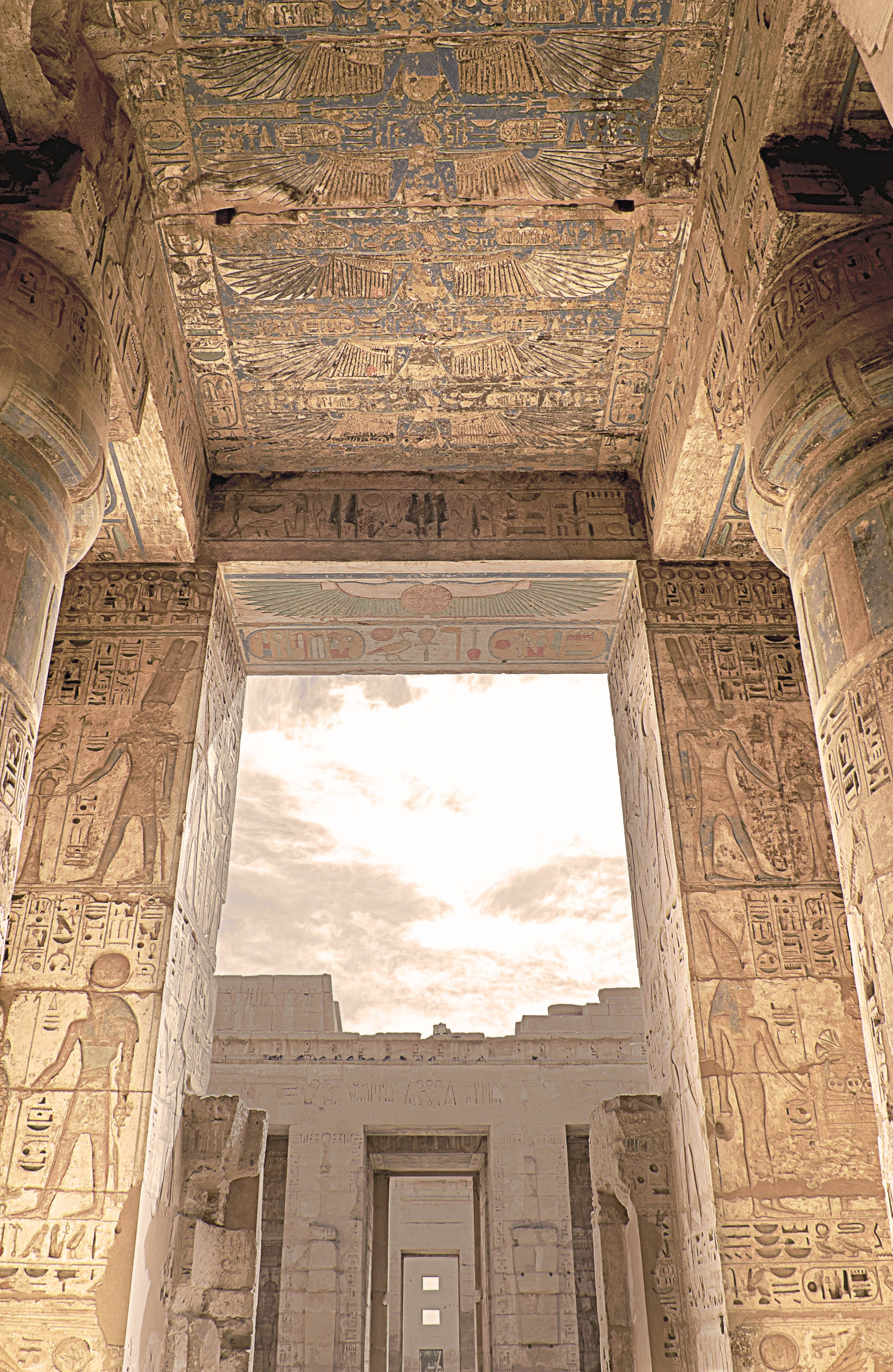
The Mortuary Temple of Ramesses III

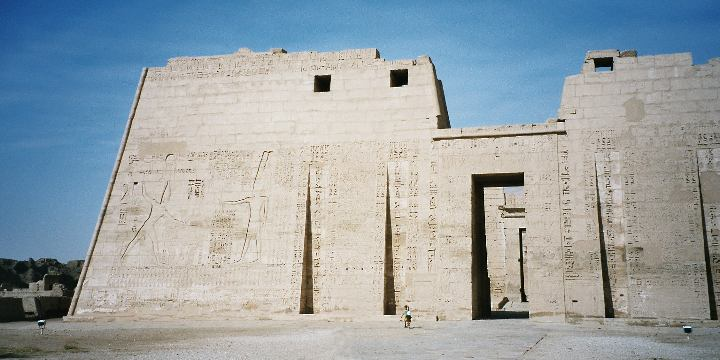
First Pylon of the Mortuary Temple of Ramesses III

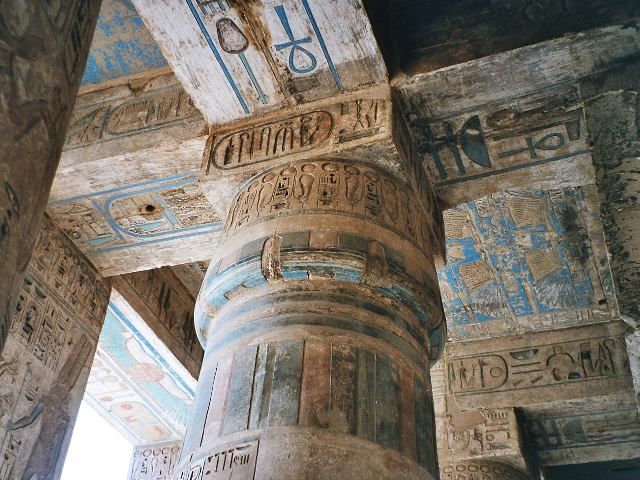
Ceiling decoration in the peristyle hall

== See also ==
- Media related to Medinet Habu at Wikimedia Commons
- Colossal statue of Amenhotep III and Tiye
- Karnak King List
- Meryatum II
- Mortuary Temple of Amenhotep III

== Archaeological reports ==
- Uvo Hölscher, with foreword by J. H. Breasted, "The Excavation of Medinet Habu, Volume 1: General Plans and Views", Oriental Institiute Publications 21, Chicago: The University of Chicago Press, 1934
- Siegfried Schott Translated By Elizabeth B. Hauser, "Wall Scenes from the Mortuary Chapel of the Mayor Paser at Medinet Habu", Studies in Ancient Oriental Civilization 30, Chicago: The University of Chicago Press, 1957
- The Epigraphic Survey, "Medinet Habu, Volume I. Earlier Historical Records of Ramses III", Oriental Institute Publications 8, Chicago: The University of Chicago Press, 1930
- Uvo Hölscher, "Excavations at Ancient Thebes, 1930/31", Oriental Institute Communications 15, Chicago: University of Chicago Press, 1932
- Harold H. Nelson and Uvo Hölscher, with a chapter by Siegfried Schott, "Work in Western Thebes, 1931–33", Oriental Institute Communications 18, Chicago: University of Chicago Press, 1934
- The Epigraphic Survey, "Medinet Habu, Volume II. The Later Historical Records of Ramses III", Oriental Institute Publications 9, Chicago: The University of Chicago Press, 1932
- William F. Edgerton and John A. Wilson, "Historical Records of Ramses III: The Texts in Medinet Habu Volumes 1 and 2 Translated With Explanatory", Studies in Ancient Oriental Civilization 12, Chicago: University of Chicago Press, 1936
- The Epigraphic Survey, "Medinet Habu, Volume III. The Calendar, the “Slaughterhouse,” and Minor Records of Ramses III", Oriental Institute Publications 23, Chicago: The University of Chicago Press, 1934
- The Epigraphic Survey, "Medinet Habu, Volume 4. Festival Scenes of Ramses III", Oriental Institute Publications 51, Chicago: The University of Chicago Press, 1940
- Elizabeth Stefanski and Miriam Lichtheim, "Coptic Ostraca from Medinet Habu", Oriental Institute Publications 71, Chicago: The University of Chicago Press, 1952
- Uvo Hölscher, "The Excavation of Medinet Habu, Volume 2: The Temples of the Eighteenth Dynasty", Oriental Institute Publications 41, Chicago: The University of Chicago Press, 1939
- Uvo Hölscher, "The Excavation of Medinet Habu, Volume 3, The Mortuary Temple of Ramses III, Part 1", Oriental Institute Publications 54, Chicago: The University of Chicago Press, 1941
- Uvo Hölscher, "The Excavation of Medinet Habu, Volume IV, The Mortuary Temple of Ramses III, part 2", Oriental Institute Publications, Volume 55, Chicago: University of Chicago Press, 1951
- The Epigraphic Survey, "Medinet Habu, Volume V. The Temple Proper, Part I: The Portico, the Treasury, and Chapels Adjoining the First Hypostyle Hall with Marginal Material from the Forecourts", Oriental Institute Publications 83, Chicago: The University of Chicago Press, 1957
- Uvo Hölscher, "Post-Ramessid Remains: The Excavation of Medinet Habu, Volume 5", Oriental Institute Publications 66, Chicago: The University of Chicago Press, 1954
- Miriam Lichtheim, "Demotic Ostraca from Medinet Habu", Oriental Institute Publications 80, Chicago: The University of Chicago Press, 1957
- The Epigraphic Survey, "Medinet Habu, Volume VI. The Temple Proper, Part II: The Re Chapel, the Royal Mortuary Complex, and Adjacent Rooms with Miscellaneous Material from the Pylons, the Forecourts, and the First Hypostyle Hall", Oriental Institute Publications 84, Chicago: The University of Chicago Press, 1963
- , "Medinet Habu, Vol. VII: The Temple Proper, Pt. III: The Third Hypostyle Hall and All Rooms Accessible from It with Friezes of Scenes from the Roof Terraces and Exterior Walls of the Temple The Epigraphic Survey", Oriental Institute Publications 93, Chicago: The University of Chicago Press, 1964 ISBN 0-226-62196-0
- The Epigraphic Survey, "Medinet Habu, Vol. VIII: The Eastern High Gate with Translations of Texts The Epigraphic Survey", Oriental Institute Publications 94, Chicago: The University of Chicago Press, 1970 ISBN 978-0-22-662197-5
- W. F. Edgerton, "Medinet Habu Graffiti: Facsimiles", Oriental Institute Publications 36, Chicago: The University of Chicago Press, 1937
- Uvo Hölscher, "Medinet Habu 1924–28 Part 1: The Epigraphic Survey of the Great Temple of Medinet Habu (Seasons 1924–25 to 1927–28) Harold H. Nelson Part 2: The Architectural Survey of the Great Temple and Palace of Medinet Habu (Season 1927–28)", Oriental Institute Communications 5, Chicago: University of Chicago Press, 1929
- John A. Wilson, "Medinet Habu Studies 1928/29 Part 1. The Architectural Survey Uvo Hölscher Part 2. The Language of the Historical Texts Commemorating Ramses III", Oriental Institute Communications 7, Chicago: University of Chicago Press, 1930
- Uvo Hölscher, "Medinet Habu Reports Part 1. The Epigraphic Survey, 1928–31 Harold H. Nelson Part 2. The Architectural Survey, 1929/30", Oriental Institute Communications 10, Chicago: University of Chicago Press, 1931
- Emily Teeter, "Scarabs, Scaraboids, Seals, and Seal Impressions from Medinet Habu", Oriental Institute Publications 118, Chicago: The Oriental Institute, 2003 ISBN 1-885923-22-8
- Emily Teeter, "Baked Clay Figurines and Votive Beds from Medinet Habu", Oriental Institute Publications 133, Chicago: The Oriental Institute, 2010 ISBN 978-1-885923-58-5
- The Epigraphic Survey, "Medinet Habu IX. The Eighteenth Dynasty Temple, Part I: The Inner Sanctuaries", Oriental Institute Publications 136, Chicago: The Oriental Institute of the University of Chicago, 2009 ISBN 978-1-885923-64-6
- The Epigraphic Survey, "Medinet Habu X. The Eighteenth Dynasty Temple, Part II: The Façade, Pillars, and Architrave Inscriptions of the Thutmosid Peripteros", ISAC Publications 1, Chicago: Institute for the Study of Ancient Cultures, 2024 ISBN 978-1-61491-103-6 Plates -
