= KV47 =

Ancient Egyptian tomb of Pharaoh Siptah

- Burial site of Siptah
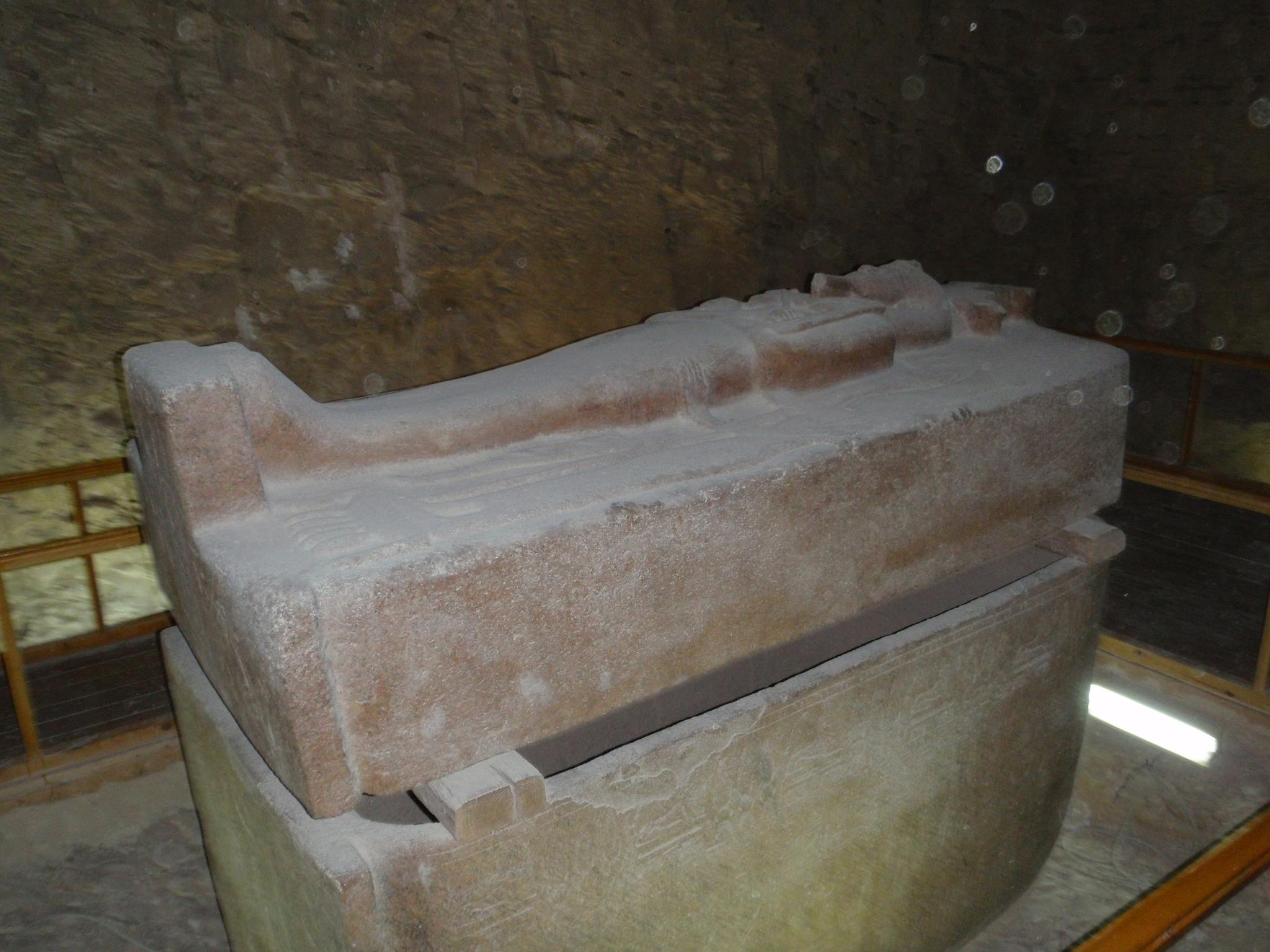
- The sarcophagus of Siptah in the burial chamber

- Location within Egypt
- Coordinates: 25°44′20.6″N 32°35′59.9″E
- Location: East Valley of the Kings
- Discovered: 18 December 1905
- Excavated by: Edward R. Ayrton (1905–1907); Harry Burton (1912–1913); Howard Carter (1922); MISR Project: Mission Siptah-Ramses X (1999–present)
- Decoration: Litany of Re; Amduat; Book of the Dead; Maat
- Layout: Straight axis
- ← Previous; KV46 Next → KV48

Tomb KV47, located in the Valley of the Kings in Egypt, was used for the burial of Pharaoh Siptah of the Nineteenth Dynasty. It was discovered on December 18, 1905 by Edward R. Ayrton, excavating on behalf of Theodore M. Davis; Siptah's mummy had been found earlier, cached in KV35. It was the last of the Nineteenth and Twentieth Dynasty kings tombs to be uncovered in the Valley. Ayrton stopped his excavation in 1907 due to safety fears, and Harry Burton returned in 1912 to dig further. The cutting of a side passage was halted after the workmen cut into Side Chamber Ja of the tomb of Tia'a (KV32). The tomb was unfinished at the time of its use.

== Location, discovery, and layout ==
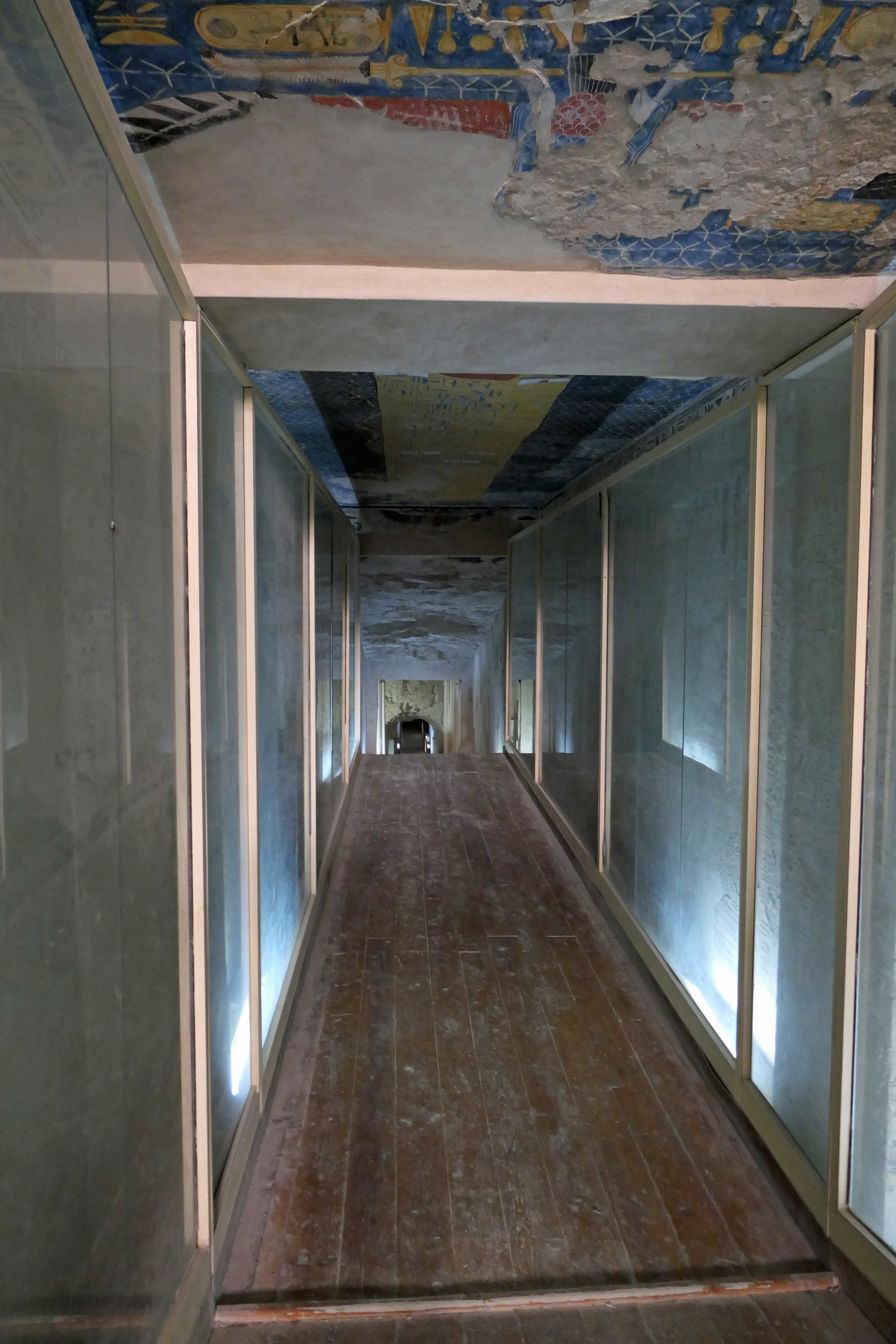
The finished section of Siptah's long 400 feet tomb passageway

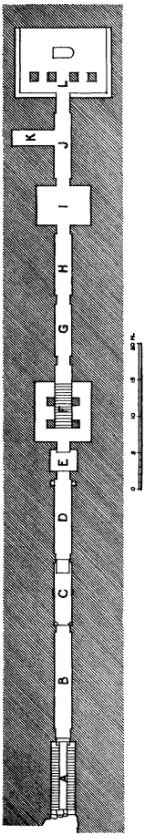
Plan of the tomb, from Burton's excavations

KV47 is located in a bay at the southern end of the Valley of the Kings, close to the contemporary tombs of Seti II (KV15), Bay (KV13), and Twosret (KV14). Unlike these tombs, which are cut into the cliff face, this tomb was cut into a tongue of rock running north to south that separates the bay from the main valley.

In November 1905 Davis secured Ayrton as his excavator, looking to continue his systematic clearance of the Valley. The investigation began by systematically running trenches towards the rock face at regular intervals, encountering the top of a flight of steps on 18 December 1905. The entrance had been buried at a depth of 6–12 feet (1.8–3.7 m) in chippings and debris from the construction of the surrounding tombs. After a day of excavation the top of the lintel was revealed, bearing the cartouches of Siptah, who had, until that point, been thought to share the tomb of Twosret.

The tomb layout consists of a ramp flanked by stairs leading down to a large stucco-covered doorway. The jambs bear the king's names and titles while the lintel depicts Isis and Nephthys adoring the sun in the form of Khnum-Kheper-Re. The entrance was once sealed by large wooden doors, as evidenced by the sockets cut into the floor and ceiling. The tomb then progresses through three hallways, which are alternately descending and flat; small niches are cut on either side at the far end of the third corridor. Next is a square chamber with a level floor, followed by a pillared hall with four columns; only one unstable column remains. A descending staircase cut into the middle of the floor leads to two further corridors. A vestibule and antechamber adjoin the Sepulchral Hall or burial chamber, which measures 9.30 by 13.50 metres (30.5 ft × 44.3 ft). Four columns arranged across the width of the chamber once supported the flat section of the roof; the rest of the chamber has a vaulted ceiling.

Ayrton considered the layout of the tomb to be similar to that of KV14, and in the general style of the period of its construction. However, there are several unusual features: Two descending corridors, instead of the conventional corridor and stairway, lead from the pillared hall; the unfinished burial chamber lacks satellite storage chambers, perhaps due to the unstable nature of the rock. Most unique is the passage commencement on the left side of the final corridor which was abandoned after it broke through into KV32, on the opposite side of the hill. It was intended to be the start of the original burial chamber, or perhaps to provide the storage rooms. Siptah's tomb has a long almost 400 foot passageway to the burial chamber but only the beginning section of this section was decorated before work stopped here; the rest of this passageway is just bare hewn rock.

== Excavation and contents ==
In the course of his investigation, Ayrton noted two distinct layers within the fill in the entrance and upper corridors: a lower level that reached the lintel and filled most of the corridors, and an upper level of flood-washed debris. An entrance had been dug into the lower layer and secured at the entrance by a wall of stacked limestone chips, indicating entry by later robbers or priests.

He cleared as far as the chamber at the end of the sunken corridors which he found to be "most unsafe to work in" due to most of the ceiling having collapsed. Furthermore, water-deposited debris, consolidated into a hard mass, complicated any further excavation. Knowing that Siptah's mummy was among those found cached in KV35, and that the tomb was likely thoroughly looted in antiquity with any surviving objects presumed to be crushed under the weight of the collapsed ceiling as evidenced by what he identified as a single fragment of an alabaster sarcophagus, Ayrton decided to abandon the excavation.

Henry Burton completed the excavation on behalf of Theodore Davis in 1912–13 "as no further collapse had occurred since Ayrton had abandoned it." Ayrton had cleared the entrance corridors, tunnelling through the debris in the following chamber, pillared hall and corridors to reach the antechamber, which he partially cleared. Burton began by fully clearing the vestibule and adjoining lower corridor which proved difficult as the flood-washed debris and mud had set hard over time. The antechamber was cleared by 23 February 1912, and work began on the next corridor where the "rubbish was so tightly packed and tough that it was scarcely possible to distinguish it from the living rock."

Work resumed on 16 December and on 2 January 1913 the Sepulchral Hall was reached. The flat front part of the ceiling had collapsed, along with the four columns that once supported it. The ceiling remained unstable, and a stone support pillar was built to support the most dangerous-looking section. This chamber was also choked with debris 2.5 metres (8.2 ft) deep at its shallowest. Upon finding it still contained the pink granite sarcophagus of the king, the temporary pillar was removed, and the most dangerous parts of the ceiling pulled down to stabilize the roof. The cartouche-shaped sarcophagus, measuring 10.25 by 5.25 feet (3.12 m × 1.60 m), was found in good condition with the lid lying face down beside it. The lid features the Osiride figure of the king flanked by Isis and Nephthys; the box is decorated with funerary texts, and an alternating band of kheker-frieze and seated jackals, with underworld deities below. Isis and Nephthys are also present at the head and foot ends. The contents of the huge box proved only to be a handful of bones from a later, Third Intermediate Period burial.

The finds from the layers of debris included pottery of a Nineteenth or Twentieth Dynasty date, ostraka, ushabti of Siptah and Seti I, a piece of wood naming 'The Royal Mother Thiy', and pieces of an alabaster ushabti for a woman. These pieces for Thiy (Tiaa) are now thought to be strays washed in from the adjacent KV32. Their presence, together with the fragments of duplicate funerary furniture, had led to the assumption that Siptah had been interred together with his mother Tiaa. However, his mother is possibly a certain Sutailja; though Dodson and Hilton see her instead as a wife of Ramesses II and the mother of his son Ramesses-Siptah.

Burton first recovered the upper and lower halves of an alabaster ushabti with an ink inscription of Siptah's prenomen across two lower corridors; in the burial chamber many more whole and broken alabaster ushabti were found. Ten of these were given by Davis to the Metropolitan Museum of Art. Also recovered from the burial chamber were many limestone jar lids decorated with a design of lotuses, along with numerous fragments of alabaster, presumably from the canopic box and other funerary furniture. Among these fragments have been identified parts of two canopic chests, an alabaster sarcophagus, and two anthropoid coffins; unexpectedly some pieces bear the name of Merenptah.

Howard Carter excavated in the entranceway of the tomb in 1922.

=== Recent investigation ===
The tomb was re-examined in 2001/2002 and 2004/2005 as part of the University of Basel's MISR Project. Walls were cleaned and consolidated, revealing traces of decoration in the antechamber. The 2001/2002 season excavations outside the tomb entrance uncovered a Nineteenth Dynasty workmen's camp. Excavations east of the entrance in the 2004/2005 season uncovered pottery, fragments of a sarcophagus of unknown origin, as well as more fragments of Siptah and Tiaa's burial equipment. The modern wooden floor was removed from the burial chamber to permit a full clearance of the remaining debris; small fragments missing from Siptah's sarcophagus were located in the course of this work.

== Decoration ==
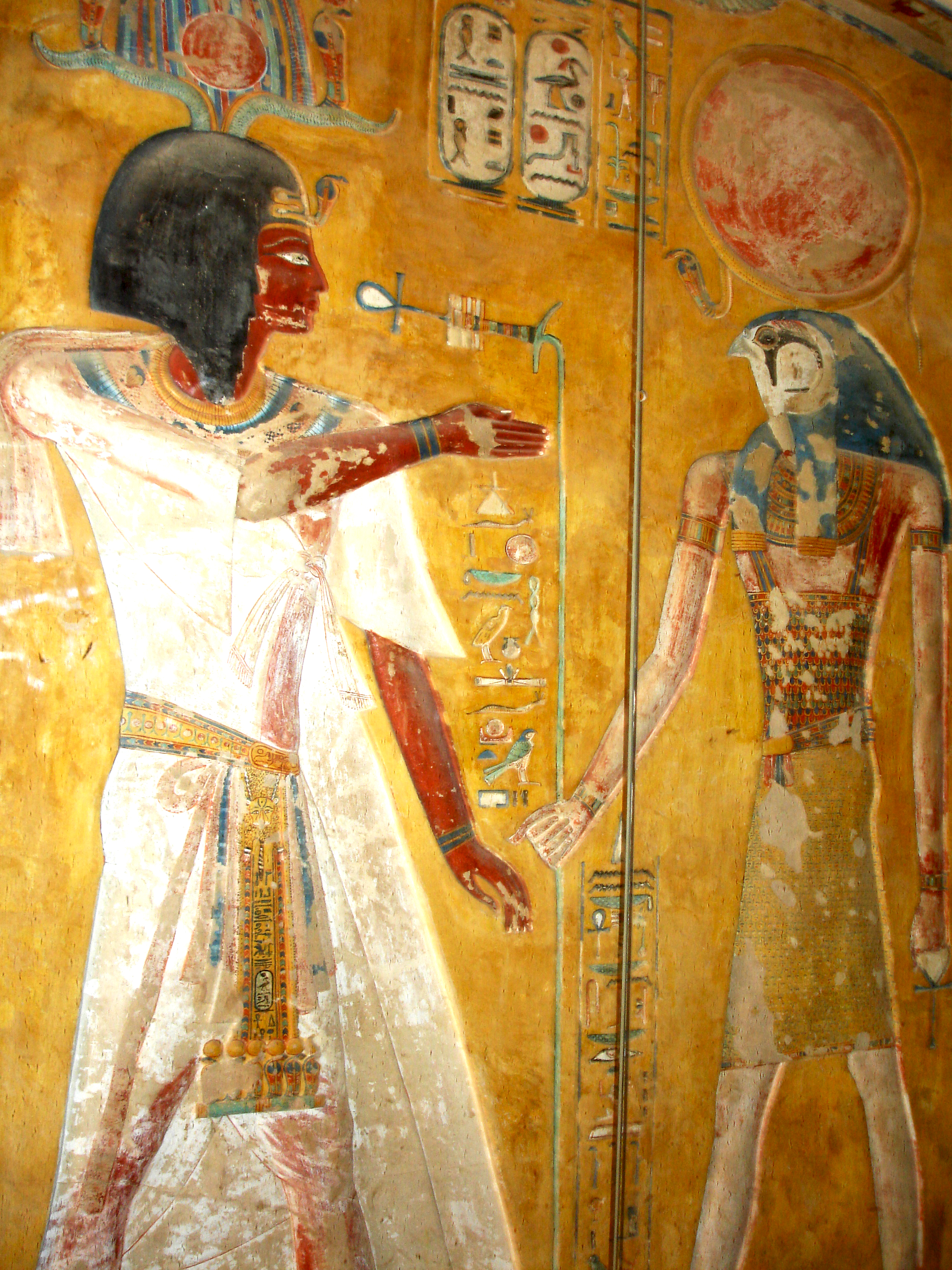
Siptah receiving life, power, and strength from Ra-Horakhty

The outer corridors are plastered and decorated to a high standard. Immediately inside the entrance, Maat is depicted on either side seated on a basket supported by the plants of Upper and Lower Egypt. Beyond, on the left side, the king receives life, power, and strength from Ra-Horakhty. Scenes from the Litany of Re dominate the first passage, with further chapters in the second; chapters from the Book of the Dead also feature in the first and second corridors. Scenes from the Amduat once decorated the third corridor, though decoration here is mostly lost, with little trace of plaster remaining. The ceiling of the first corridor features vultures with outstretched wings; "unbesmirched by soot and smoke they remain one of the finest examples of such ceilings in the Valley." The second corridor has a ceiling painted with yellow stars on a blue background and a central band of inscription, taken from the Litany of Re. Traces of decoration depicting chapters of the Amudat also remain in the antechamber.

=== Recut cartouches ===
Throughout the tomb, the cartouches of Siptah were cut out then recarved; these changes are overlaid by the lower level of debris. Spalinger suggested that this occurred in the Nineteenth Dynasty, with the erasures by Twosret and the restorations by Bay. However, it is now known that Bay was executed in the fifth year of Siptah's reign. Hartwig Altenmüller sees the erasure and restoration as part of an updating of the tomb. In this scenario, Twosret usurped the sarcophagus for her own burial; the updating of the names throughout the tomb occurred when it was returned in the reign of Setnakhte. However, Twosret's own granite sarcophagus, later usurped for Prince Amenherkhepshef, was located by Altenmüller in his excavation of KV13.

Possibly related to the altering of the cartouches is the find of an ostraca mentioning a gang of workmen:

Year 7, 2 Akhet [day] 1. Going up to complete the work in this place by the gang: (list of thirty-five workmen)

Jaroslav Černý dates the inscription to the late Twentieth through early Twenty-first Dynasties. Reeves suggests that, given the ostraca's association with the earlier entrance dug into the lower fill layer, it refers to the dismantling of the burial and removal of the king's body for reburial elsewhere.

The cartouches on sarcophagus have also been recut, though as elsewhere, this does not necessarily mean the item was co-opted for the king's burial.

== Image gallery ==
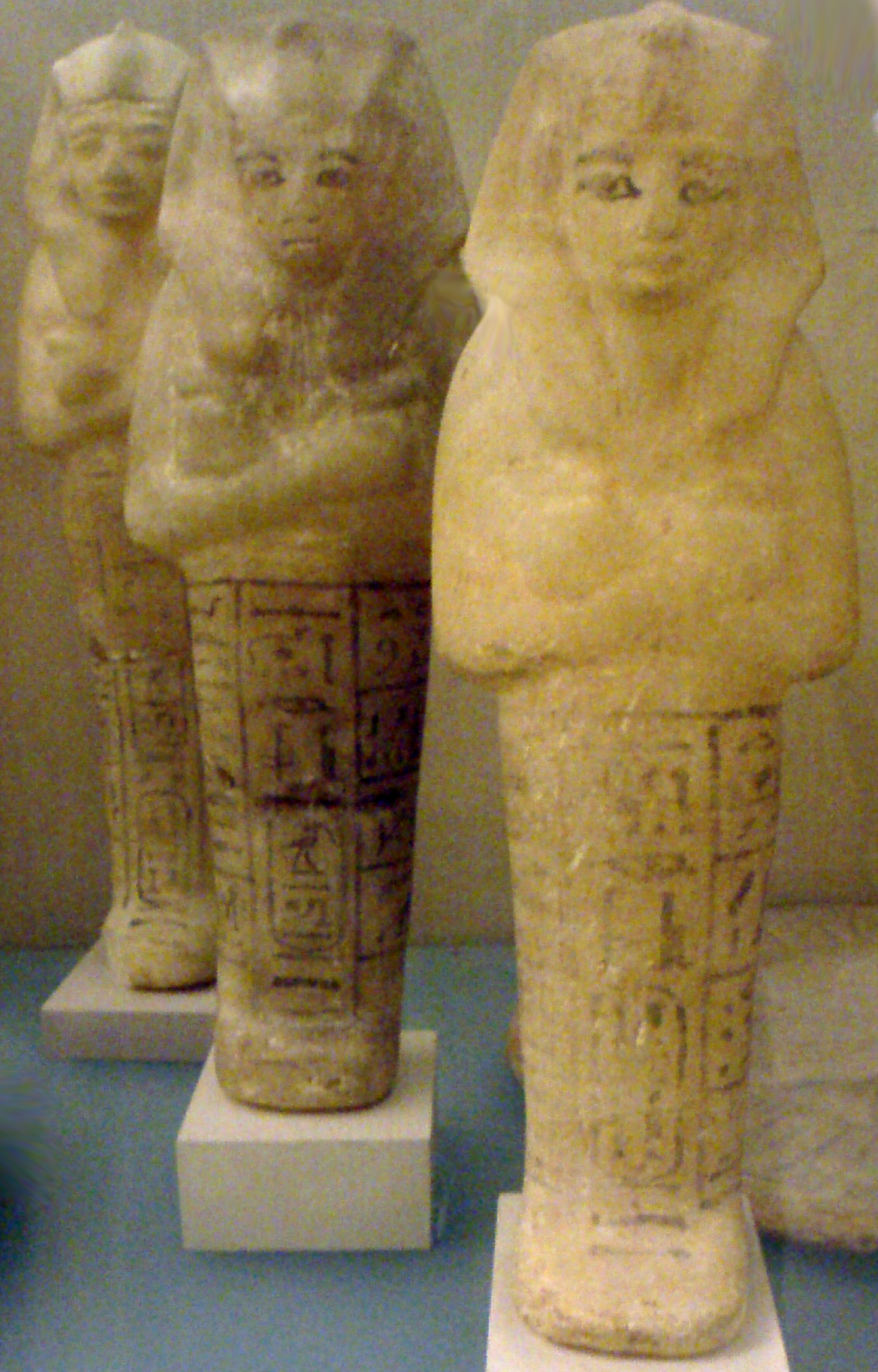
Several ushabti of Siptah, now in the Metropolitan Museum of Art.

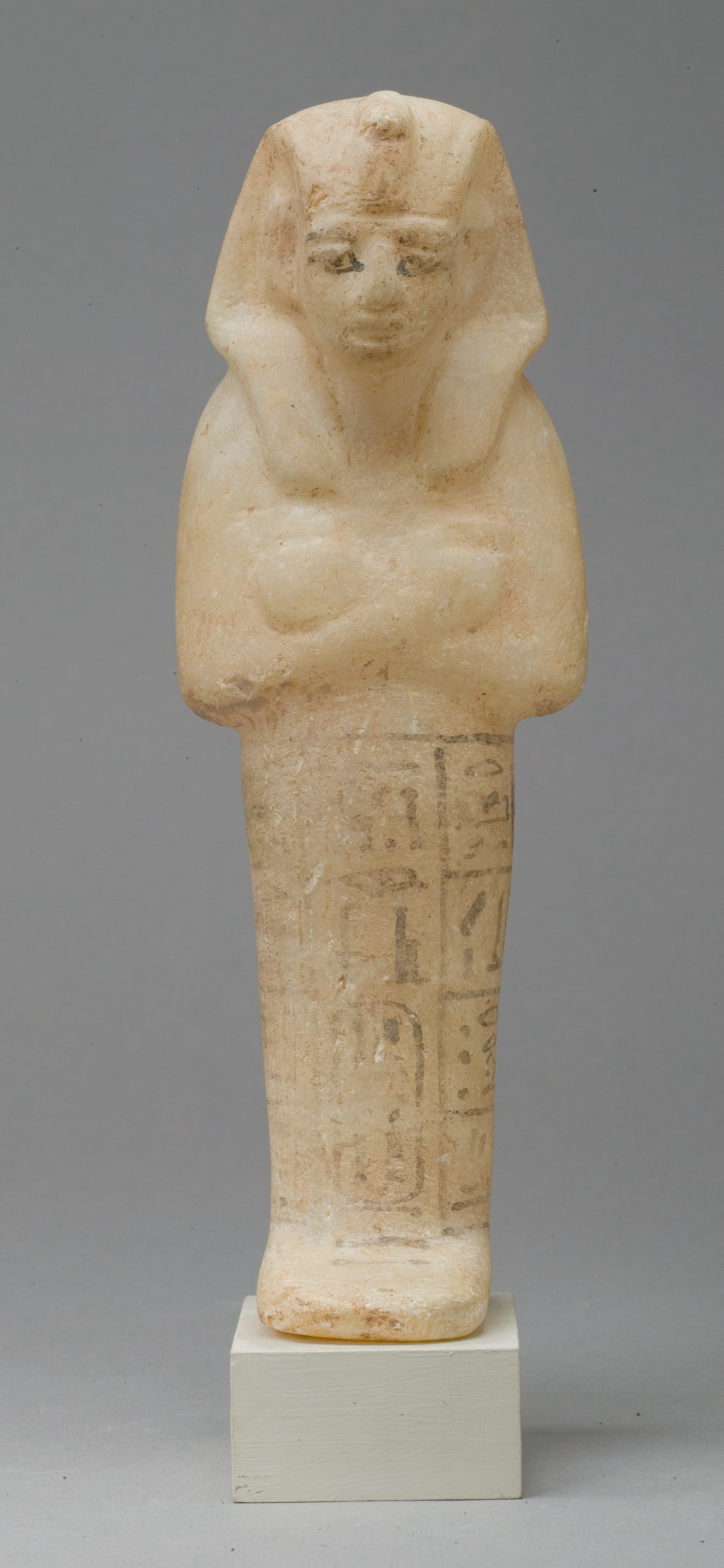
An ushabti of Siptah, now in the Metropolitan Museum of Art.

Entrance to Siptah's tomb

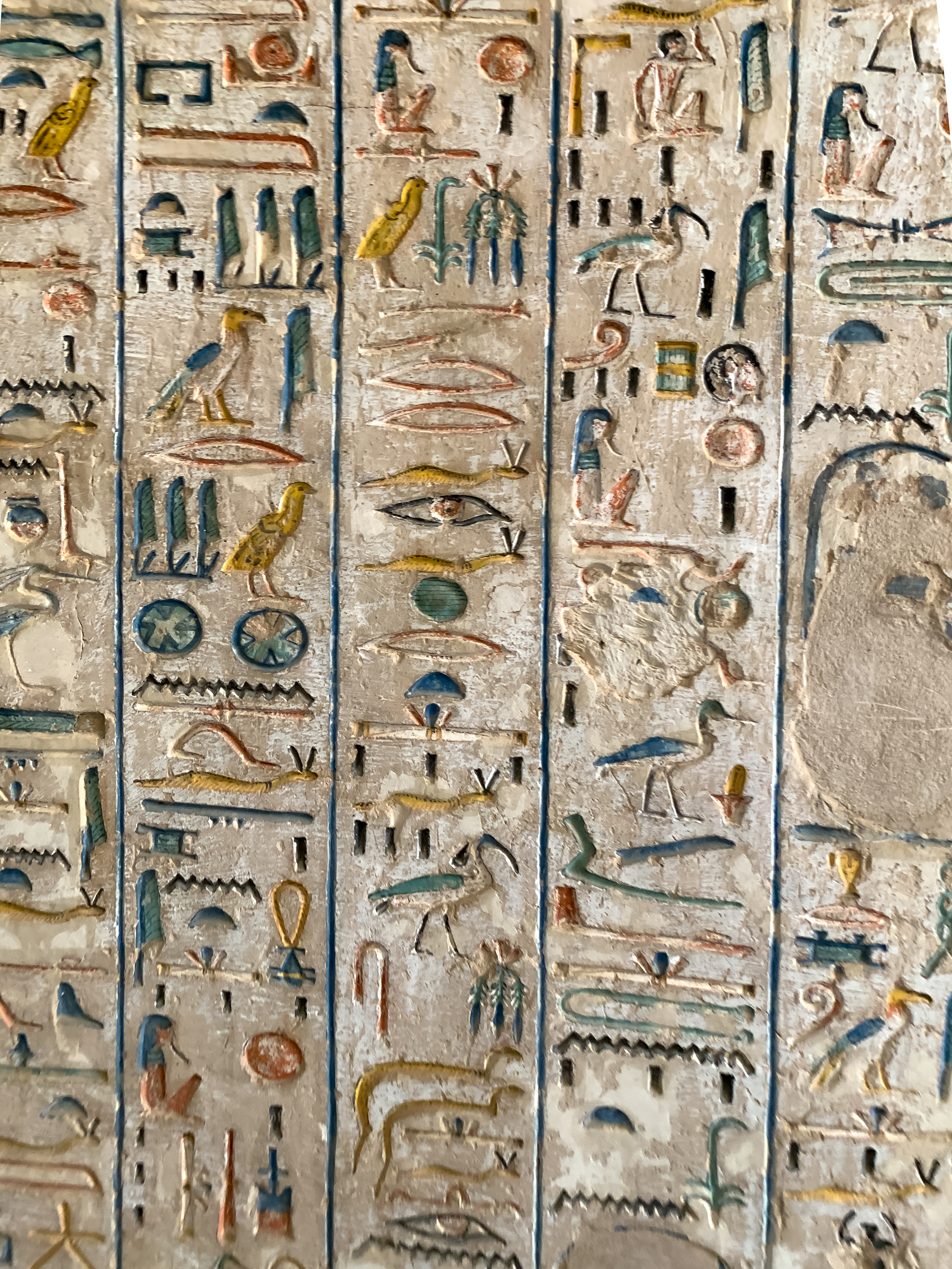
Hieroglyphs from Siptah’s tomb

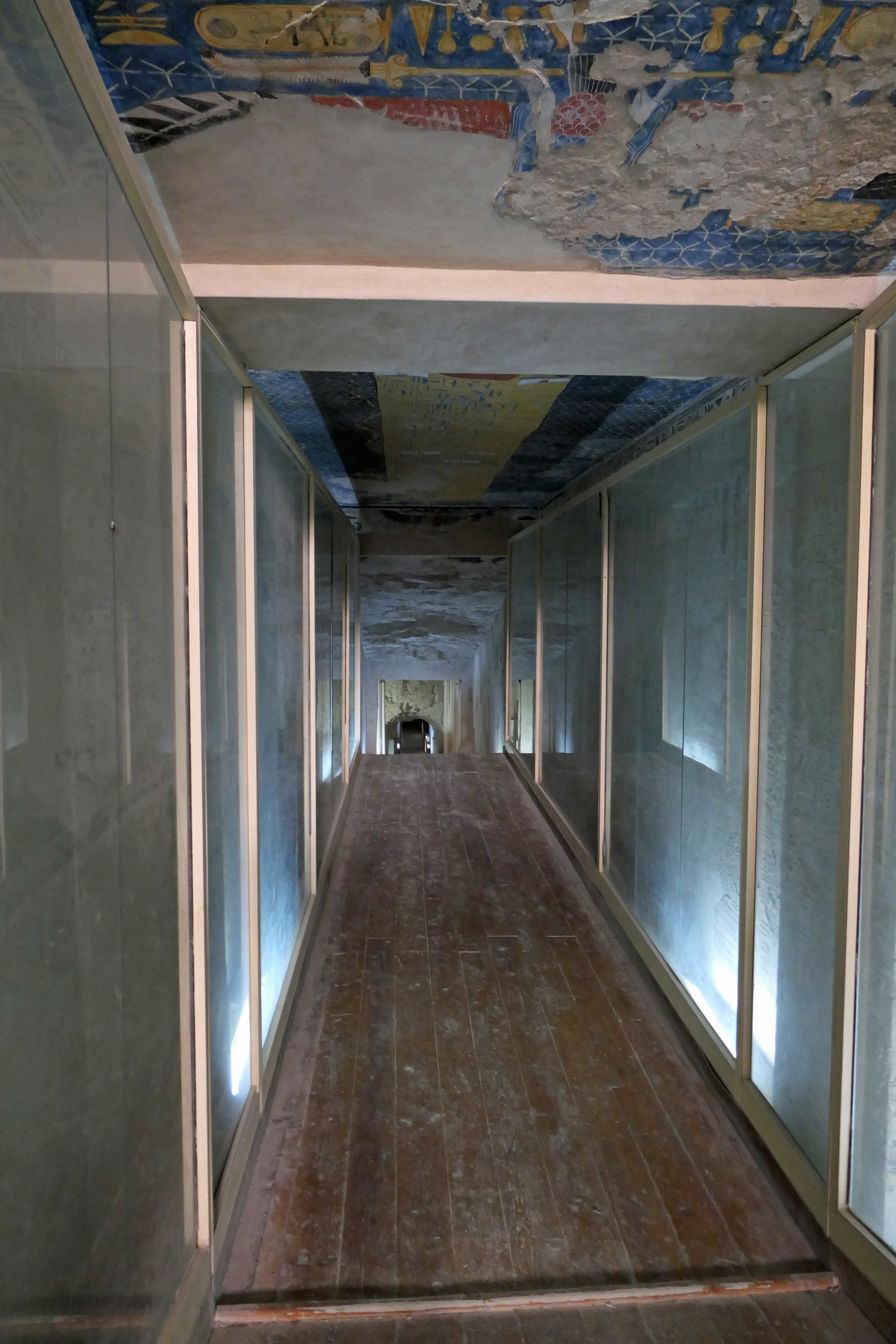
Looking into the long passageway of Siptah's tomb

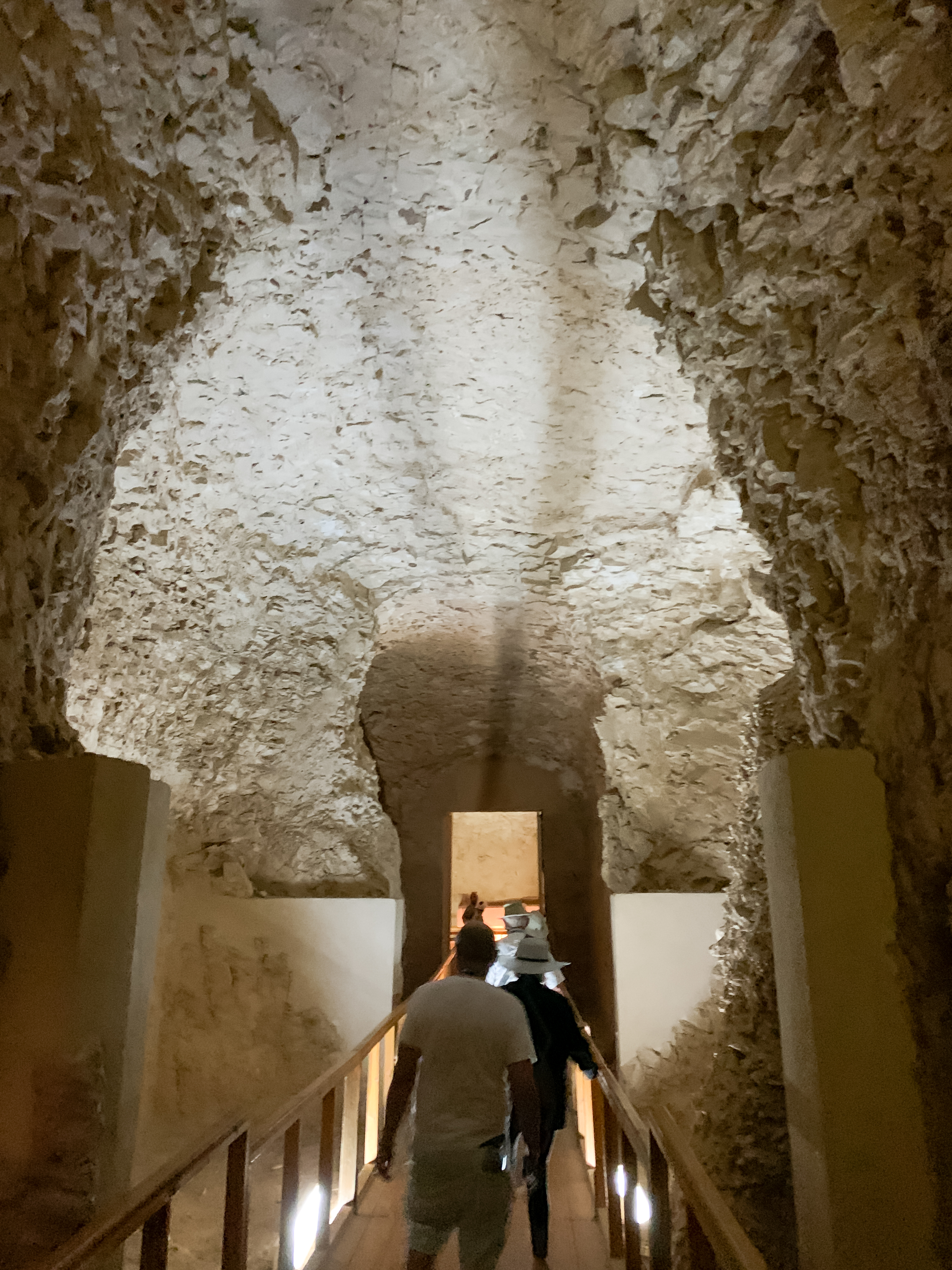
The unfinished long passageway of Siptah's tomb to the burial chamber
