= Tiaa (disambiguation) =

Tiaa (15th century BC) was an Ancient Egyptian queen of the 18th dynasty, the wife of Amenhotep II and mother of Thutmose IV.

Tiaa or TIAA may refer to:

- Tiaa (princess) (15th century BC), Egyptian princess of the 18th dynasty, daughter of Thutmose IV
- Tia (princess) (13th century BC), or Tiaa, Egyptian princess of the 19th dynasty, daughter of Seti I
- Tiaa (wife of Seti II) (12th century BC), Egyptian noblewoman and wife of Seti II
- TIAA, an American financial services company
- Texas Intercollegiate Athletic Association (TIAA), an American college sports conference that operated from 1909 to 1932
- Texas Intercollegiate Athletic Association (1976–1996) (TIAA), an American college sports conference within NCAA Division III that operated from 1976 to 1996
