= Tiaa (wife of Seti II) =

Ancient egyptian queen

Tiaa or Tiya or Tiy was thought to be the third wife of Pharaoh Seti II, after Takhat and Twosret. Fragments of her burial equipment were found in the tomb of Siptah (KV47), leading to the impression that she might have lived at the end of the 19th Dynasty. However, the king's tomb is connected to the burial of the 18th Dynasty queen Tiaa. The burial equipment of Tiaa mixed into the burial of Siptah. Recent research showed that all artifacts of a queen Tiaa belong to the 18th Dynasty queen. She is thought by some to have been Syrian (Ḫurru). She was once thought to be the mother of Rameses-Siptah (Siptah Merenptah), the next Pharaoh of Egypt after the death of his predecessor Seti II. However, Siptah's mother is now known to be a Canaanite woman named Sutailja or Shoteraja from a newly discovered relief in the Louvre museum.
