= Siptah =

Pharaoh of Egypt from 1197 to 1191 BC

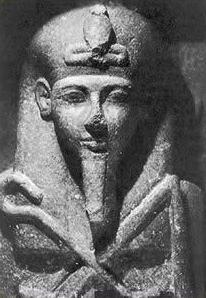
- Sarcophagus of Siptah in his KV47 tomb

Pharaoh
- Reign: 1197–1191 BC
- Predecessor: Seti II
- Successor: Twosret
Royal titulary
Horus name
Kanakht Meryhapi Sankhtanebemkafraneb
K3-nḫt-mrj-Ḥˁpj-s-ˁnḫ-t3-nb-m-k3=f-Rˁ-nb
Strong bull, beloved of Hapi, who causes the whole land to live by means of his Ka every day
G5	E1 kA mr D42 H p N35A s tA nb M kA Z1 f ra Z1 nb
Nebty name
Saaiunu
Sˁ3-Jwnw
Made great in Heliopolis
G16	s aA D42 A iwn nw niwt
Golden Horus
[...]mi Itefre
...mj-jt=f-Rˁ
[...] like his father Re
G8	HASH mi M17 M17 t f G7 r D42 ra G7
Prenomen
Sekhaienre Meryamun
Sḫˁj-n-Rˁ-mrj-Jmn
He whom Ra causes to appear, beloved of Amun M23 t L2 t < ra s xa n N36 i mn n >
After the 2nd year
Akhenre Setepenre
3ḫ-n-Rˁ-stp-n-Rˁ
Akh spirit of Ra, the chosen one of Ra
sw bit < ra G25 x n ra stp n >
Nomen
Ramesses-Siptah
Rˁ-mssw-s3-Ptḥ
Ra fashioned him, son of Ptah
G39 N5 < C2 F31 z z H8 Z1 p t H >
After the 2nd year
Merenptah-Siptah
Mrj-n-Ptḥ-s3-Ptḥ
Beloved of Ptah, son of Ptah
G39 N5 < p t H N36 n p t H H8 Z2 >
- Father: Uncertain: currently debated to be either Seti II or Amenmesse
- Mother: Sutailya?
- Died: 1191 BC
- Burial: KV47; Mummy found in the KV35 royal cache (Theban Necropolis)
- Dynasty: 19th Dynasty

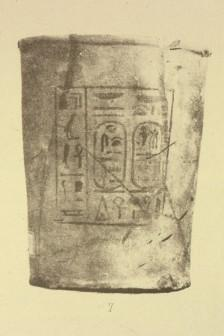
Goblet for an Apis died under the early reign of Siptah, 19th dynasty, New Kingdom. Found in the Serapeum of Saqqara, now in the Louvre Museum (n. 442).

Akhenre Setepenre Siptah or Merneptah Siptah was the penultimate ruler of the Nineteenth Dynasty of Egypt. His father's identity is currently unknown. Both Seti II and Amenmesse have been suggested although the fact that Siptah later changed his royal name or nomen to Merneptah Siptah after his Year 2 suggests rather that his father was Merneptah. If correct, this would make Siptah and Seti II half-brothers since both of them were sons of Merneptah.

He was not the crown prince, but succeeded to the throne as a child after the death of Seti II. His accession date occurred on I Peret day 2 around the month of December.

== Origins ==
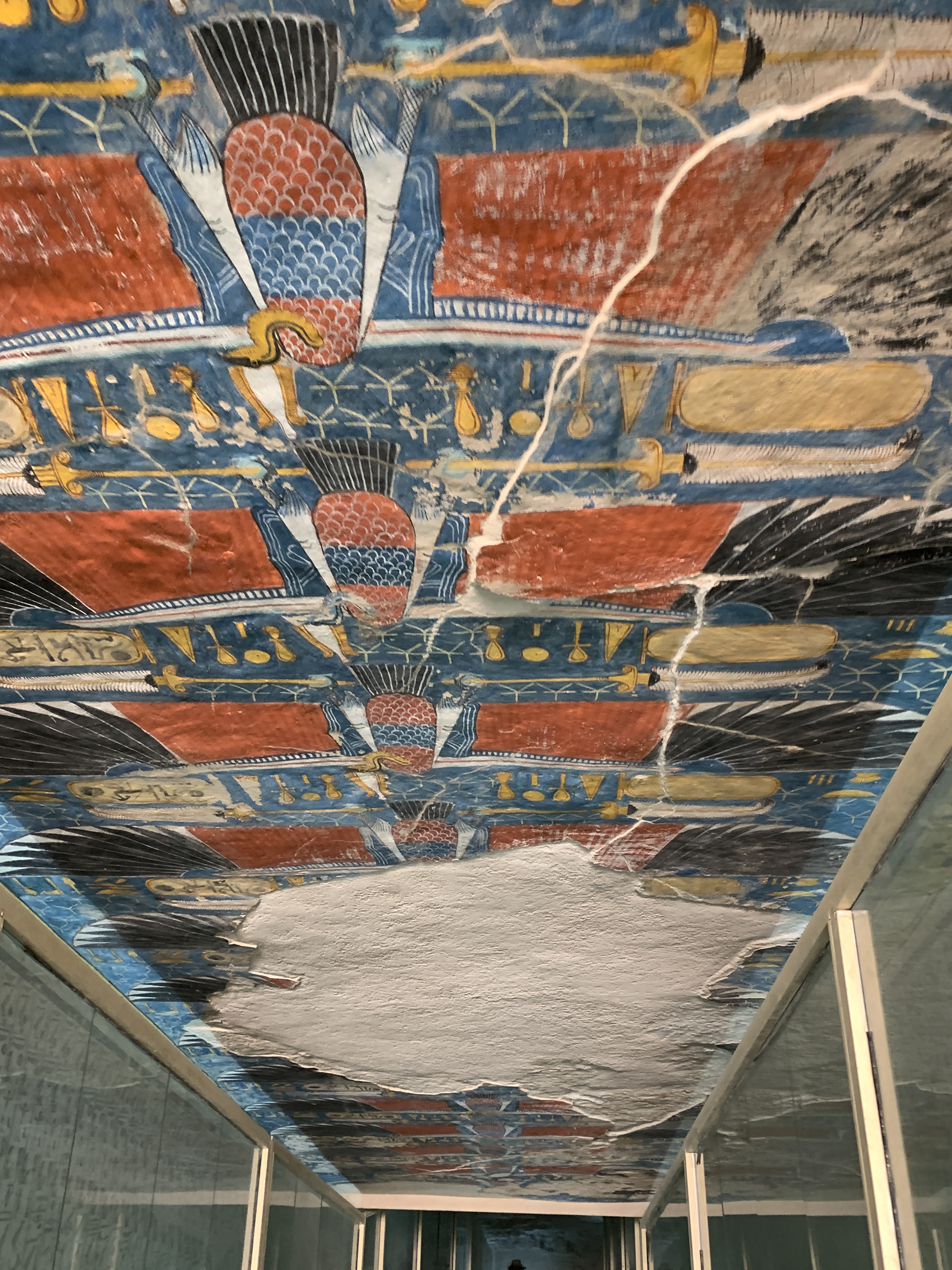
Tomb ceiling of KV47, Siptah's tomb.

Initially after Siptah's name was rediscovered by Egyptology (for it had been omitted by Manetho), it was believed that Tiaa, a wife of Seti II, was the mother of Siptah. This view persisted until it was eventually realized that a relief in the Louvre Museum (E 26901) "pairs Siptah's name together with the name of his mother" a certain Sutailya or Soteraya.

Sutailya was a Canaanite rather than a native Egyptian name, which means that she was almost certainly a king's concubine from Canaan. However, Dodson/Hilton assert that this is not correct and that the lady was, instead, the mother of Ramesses-Siptah and a wife of Ramesses II.

The identity of his father is currently unknown; some Egyptologists speculate it may have been Amenmesse rather than Seti II since both Siptah and Amenmesse spent their youth in Chemmis and both are specifically excluded from Ramesses III's Medinet Habu procession of statues of ancestral kings unlike Merneptah or Seti. This suggests that Amenmesse and Siptah were inter-related in such a way that they were "regarded as illegitimate rulers and that therefore they were probably father and son." However, another interpretation here is that Siptah was regarded as illegitimate by the later 20th dynasty kings since Siptah required the assistance of Chancellor Bay to secure the kingship since he was just another minor son of Merneptah rather than a direct son of Seti II.

A headless statue of Siptah now in Munich shows him seated on the lap of another Pharaoh, presumably his father. The British Egyptologist Aidan Dodson states

The only ruler of the period who could have promoted such destruction was Amenmesse, and likewise he was the only king whose offspring would have required such explicit promotion. The demolition of this figure is likely to have closely followed the fall of Bay or the death of Siptah himself, when any short-lived rehabilitation of Amenmesse would have ended.

If Siptah was a son of Seti II, it is unlikely that he would have been considered as an illegitimate king by later 20th Dynasty New Kingdom pharaohs. Due to his youth and perhaps his problematic parentage, he was placed under the guidance of his stepmother—the queen regent Twosret.

== Reign ==
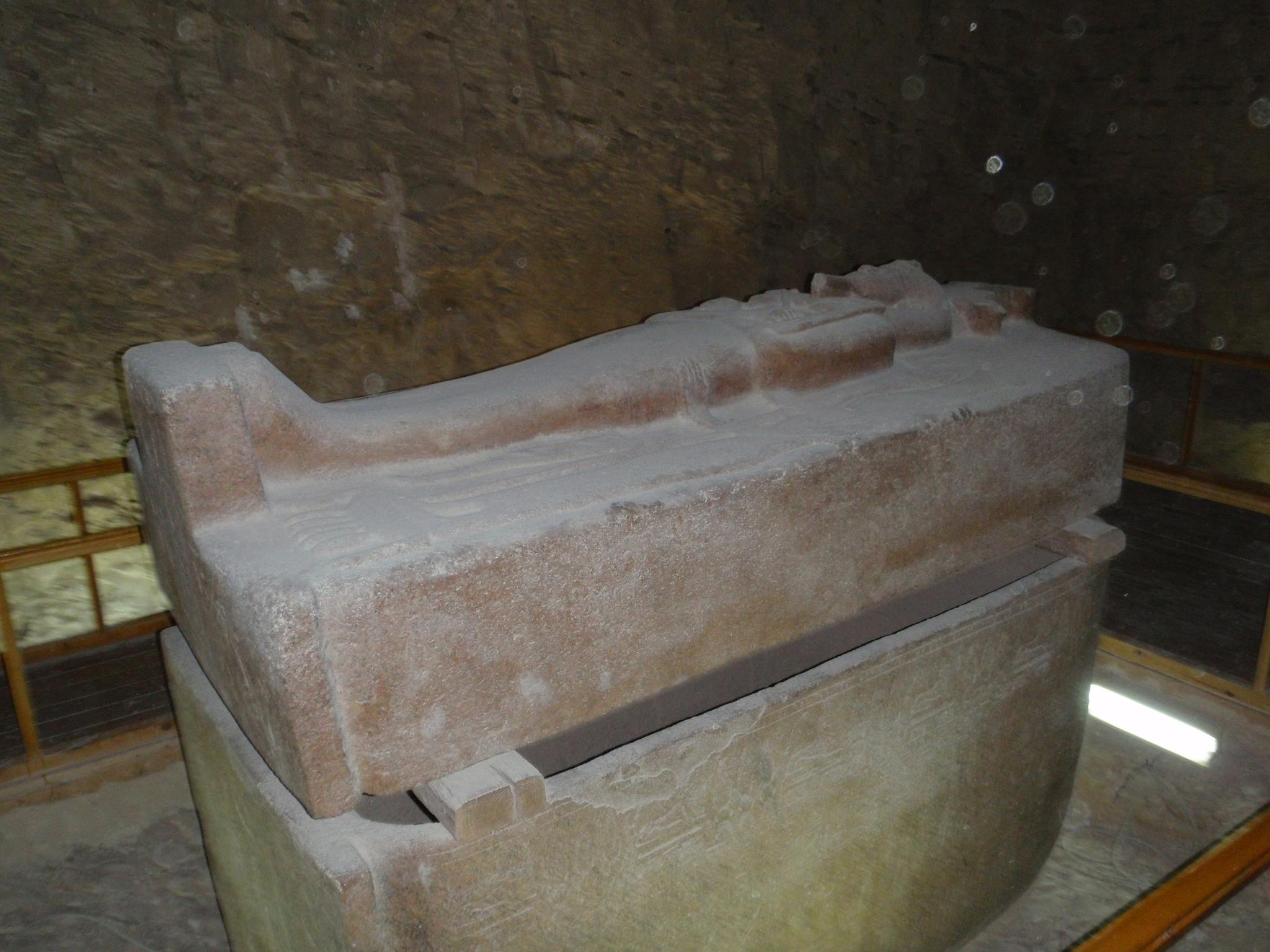
Siptah's sarcophagus in his KV47 tomb

Siptah ruled Egypt for almost six years as a young man. Siptah was only a child of ten or eleven years when he assumed power.

Chancellor Bay publicly boasts that he was instrumental in installing Siptah on the throne in several inscriptions including an Aswan stela set up by Seti, the Viceroy of Kush and at Gebel el-Silsila. A key graffito located at the entrance to the Speos of Horemheb at Gebel el-Silsila depicts Bay standing in a pose of adoration directly behind Siptah, who is making an offering to Amun; a following inscription in the graffito reads:

the spirit of the Great Superintendent of the Seal of the entire land, who established the King [Siptah] in the place of his father; beloved of his lord, Bay.

Bay, however, later fell out of favor at court presumably for overreaching himself and last appears in public in a dated Year 4 inscription from Siptah's reign. He was executed in the fifth year of Siptah's reign, on orders of the king himself. News of his execution was passed to the Workmen of Deir el-Medina in Ostraca IFAO 1254. This ostraca was translated and published in 2000 by Pierre Grandet in a French Egyptological journal. Gae Callender notes that the reason for the king's message to the workmen was to notify them to cease all work on decorating Bay's tomb since Bay had now been deemed a traitor to the state.

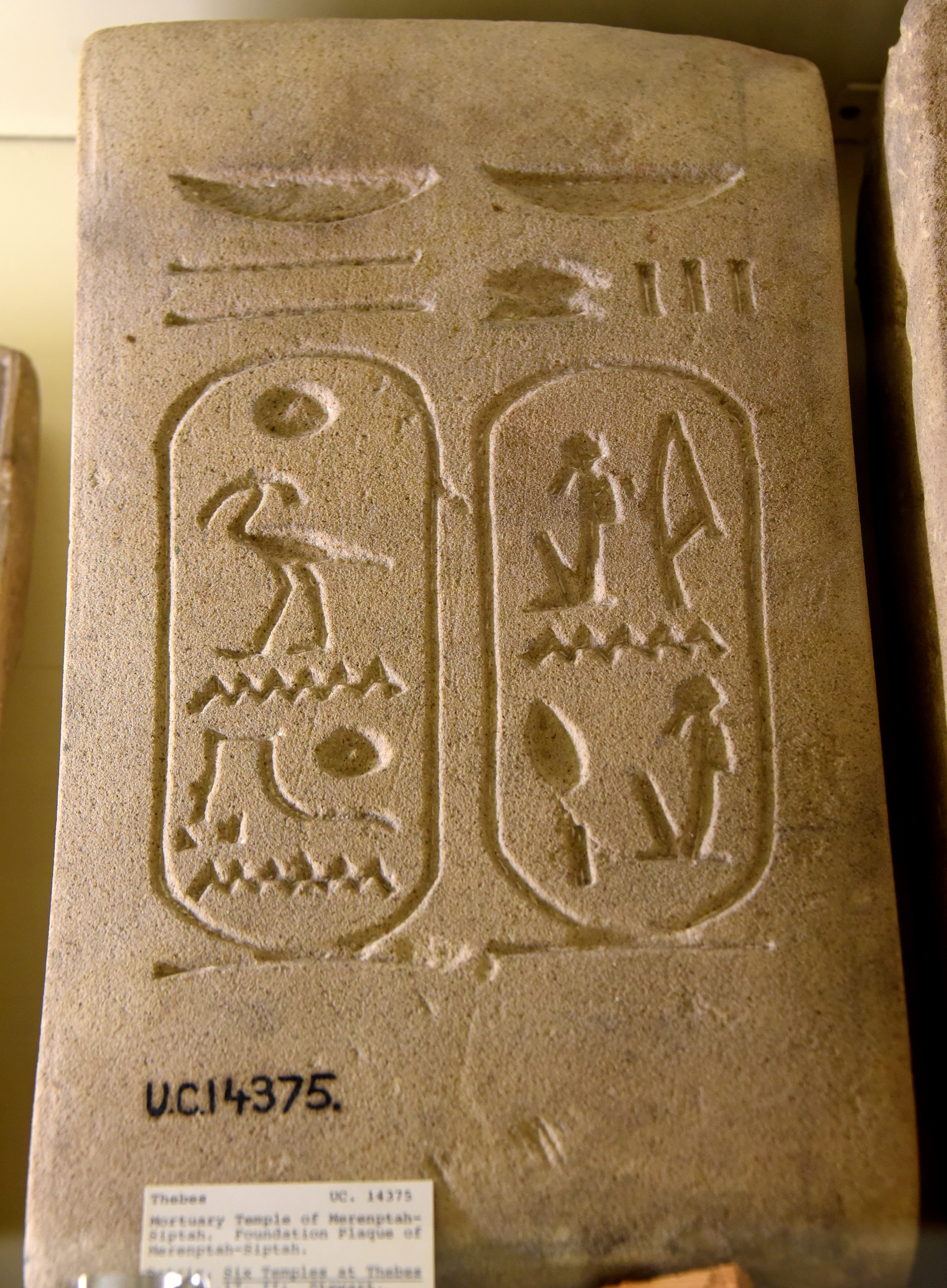
Foundation sandstone block showing 2 cartouches of king Siptah (Saptah, Merenptah-Siptah). 19th Dynasty. From the mortuary temple of Merenptah-Siptah at Thebes, Egypt. The Petrie Museum of Egyptian Archaeology, London

Siptah himself is last attested sometime in his 6th regnal Year on a graffito located at the South Temple of Buhen. He likely died in the middle of II Akhet—perhaps around II Akhet 12 of his 6th Year. This assumes a traditional 70-day mummification period if Siptah was buried on IV Akhet 22.

Evidence for his burial on the latter date is recorded in ostracon O. Cairo CG 25792. This ostraca from Deir el-Medina mentions that the Vizier Hori visited the workmen of Deir el-Medina first on II Akhet 24 and second on IV Akhet 19. The final line on the ostracon reads as: "IV Akhet 22: Burial took place". Since this event can only refer to a king's burial, the question here is the identity of this king.

Hori was appointed vizier around Regnal Year 6 II Shemu 6 and I Peret [X] of Seti II's reign and held this office through the reigns of Siptah, Twosret and Setnakht and into that of Ramesses III. The ostracon could not refer to Setnakht's death because this king died on I Shemu 25 since his son, Ramesses III succeeded him the next day. Twosret was ousted from power by Setnakht; therefore, the burial does not refer to her either.

== Death ==
Seti II must have died in late IV Akhet or early I Peret—after the 70-day mummification period—since a graffito located above KV14, Twosret's tomb, records his burial on III Peret 11. Therefore, the IV Akhet 22 burial date likely records the burial of Siptah himself. Siptah's death would have occurred sometime around II Akhet 12. Siptah himself would have ruled Egypt for approximately 5 years and 10 months since his predecessor, Seti II, died around the end of IV Akhet and the beginning of I Peret, even if he did not legally assume the throne until the start of II Akhet with the aid of the powerful court official Bay.

After his death, Twosret simply assumed his Regnal Years and ruled Egypt as a queen for a year or two at the most.

=== Tomb ===
The Tomb of Siptah (Valley of the Kings KV47), did not contain his mummy. In 1898, it was discovered along with 18 others in a mummy cache within the (KV35) tomb of Amenhotep II. The study of his tomb shows that it was conceived and planned in the same style as those of Twosret and Bay, clearly part of the same architectural design.

=== Mummy ===
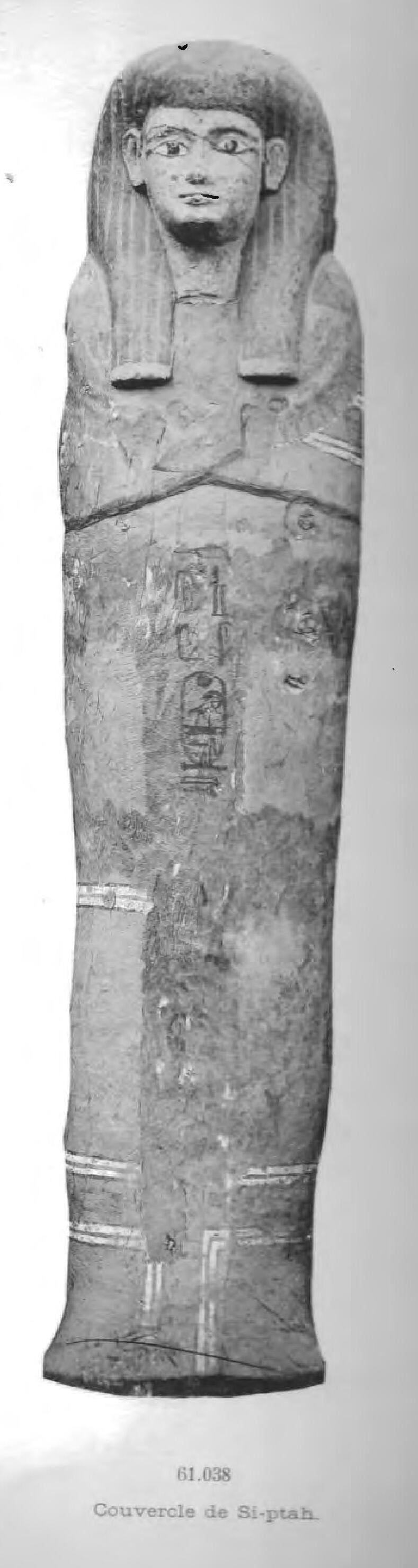
Coffin of Siptah

The Mummy of Siptah (Cairo, National Museum CG 61080) shows severely deformed Pes equinovarus-like left foot and a shortened left leg, which may indicate polio. A medical examination of his mummy reveals the king was about sixteen years old at death. He was tall at 1.6 metres, had curly reddish-brown hair, and likely had poliomyelitis, with a deformed left foot.

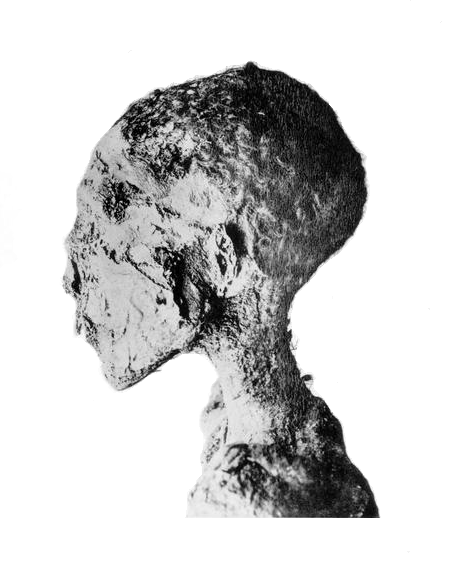
Mummy of Siptah

In April 2021, his mummy was moved from the Museum of Egyptian Antiquities to the National Museum of Egyptian Civilization along with those of 17 other kings and 4 queens in an event termed the Pharaohs' Golden Parade.

== See also ==
- KV47

== Bibliography ==
- Kevin Lee Johnson, Transition and Legitimation in Egypt's Nineteenth and Twentieth Dynasties: A Study of the Reigns, of Siptah, Tausret, and Setnakht PDF, The University of Memphis, August 2012,
