= KV13 =

Ancient Egyptian tomb

- Burial site of Bay, Amenherkhepshef and Mentuherkhepsef
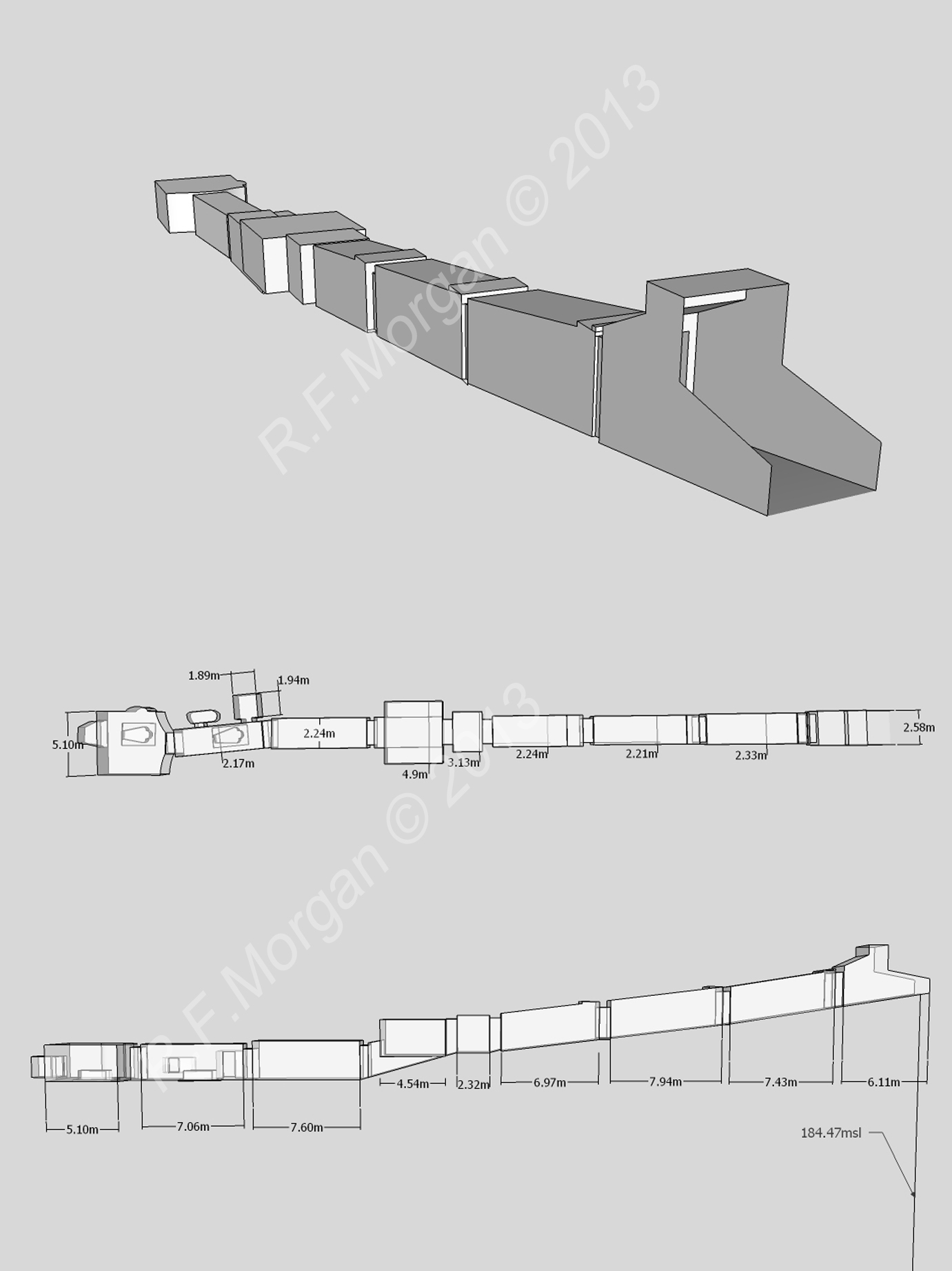
- KV13 schematic

- Location within Egypt
- Coordinates: 25°44′21.2″N 32°35′58.4″E
- Location: East Valley of the Kings
- Discovered: 1988
- Excavated by: Hartwig Altenmüller (1988–1994)
- Decoration: Book of the Dead
- Layout: Straight axis
- ← Previous; KV12 Next → KV14

Tomb KV13, located in the Valley of the Kings in Egypt, was cut and decorated for the burial of the noble Bay of the Nineteenth Dynasty. An ostraca published in the French Egyptological journal BIFAO in 2000 records that Chancellor Bay was executed by pharaoh Siptah. Consequently, Bay was never buried in his tomb. Moreover, no funerary goods were found in the tomb belonging to Bay. It was later reused by two princes of the Twentieth Dynasty, Mentuherkhepsef, a son of Ramesses III, and his nephew, Amenherkhepshef, a son of Ramesses VI.
