= Hartwig Altenmüller =

German Egyptologist (born 1938)

Hartwig Altenmüller (born 1938, in Saulgau, Württemberg, Germany) is a German Egyptologist. He became professor at the Archaeological Institute of the University of Hamburg in 1971. He worked as an archaeologist in Saqqara from 1969 to 1982, and then the Valley of the Kings (where he worked on KV13, KV14 and KV47) from 1984 to 1998, retiring in 2003.

== Publications ==
- Zwei Annalenfragmente aus dem frühen Mittleren Reich, Hamburg 2015, ISBN 978-3-87548-712-1
- "Lederbänder und Lederanhänger von der Mumie des Chonsu-maacheru" and "Die Mumienbinden des Chonsu-maacheru " in Alt-Ägypten 30 (2000), pp. 73–76, 88–89, 102–114.
- "Zwei Ostraka und ein Baubefund: Zum Tod des Schatzkanzlers Bay im 3 Regierungsjahr des Siptah." Göttinger Miszellen: Beiträge zur Ägyptologische Diskussion 171: 13–18 (1999).
- "Dritter Vorbericht uber die Arbeiten des Archäologischen Instituts der Universität Hamburg am Grab des Bay (KV 13) im Tal der Könige von Theben." Studien zur altägyptischen Kultur 21: 1–18 (1994).
- "Bemerkungen zu den Königsgräbern des Neuen Reiches." Studien zur altägyptischen Kultur 10: 25–61 (1983).
