= KV12 =

Ancient Egyptian tomb

- Burial site of Unknown personages
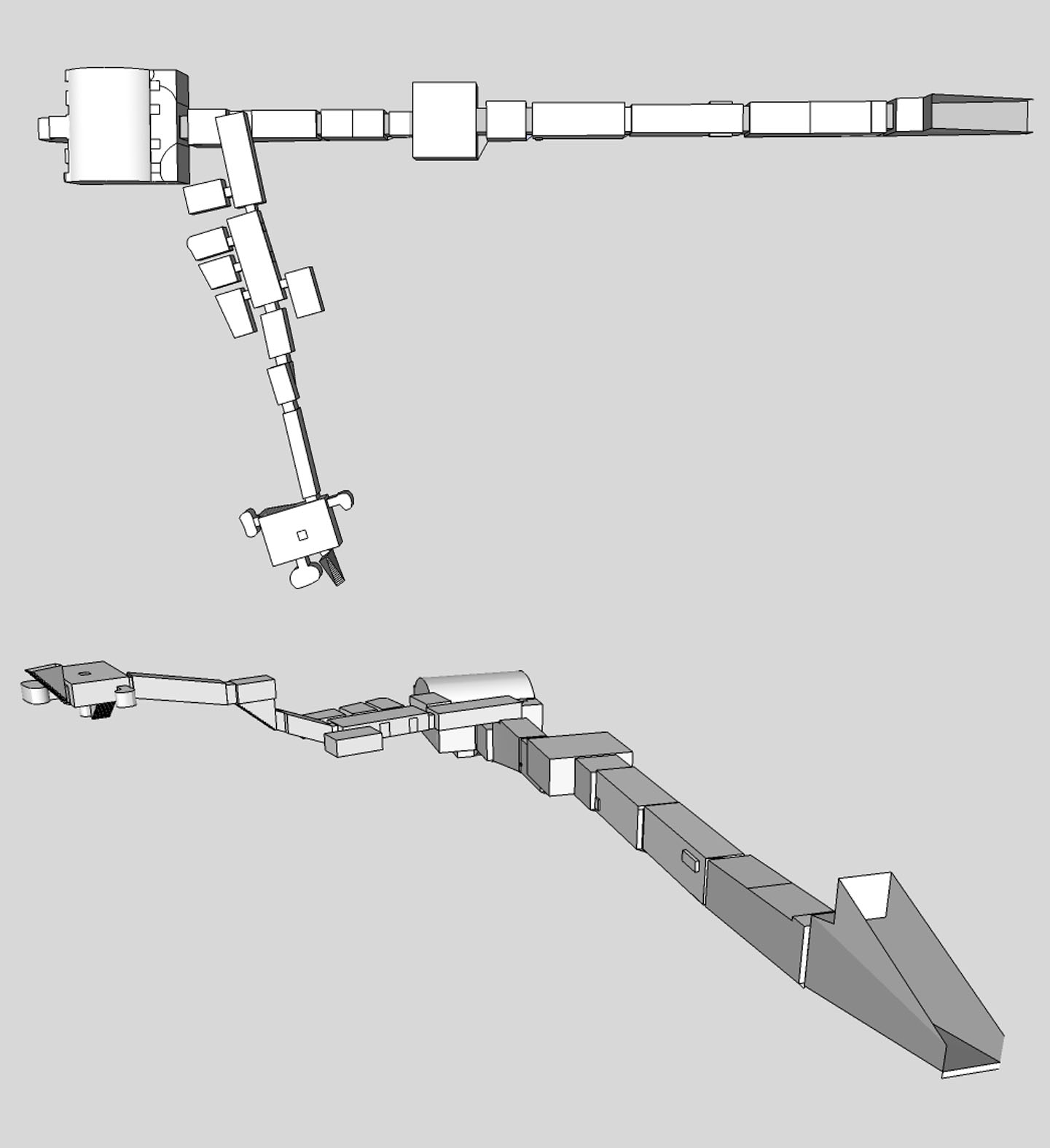
- KV9 and KV12 schematic

- Location within Egypt
- Coordinates: 25°44′24.0″N 32°36′01.5″E
- Location: East Valley of the Kings
- Discovered: Open in antiquity
- Excavated by: Harold Jones (1908–09); Howard Carter (1920–21); Otto Schaden
- Decoration: Undecorated
- Layout: Straight axis
- ← Previous; KV11 Next → KV13

Located in the Valley of the Kings, Tomb KV12 is an unusual tomb, used originally in the Eighteenth Dynasty of Ancient Egypt, and then again in the Nineteenth and Twentieth Dynasties. It was probably used for multiple burials of royal family members, similarly to KV5.

The builders of KV9 broke unintentionally into KV12 whilst excavating that tomb. James Burton, who visited the tomb in the 1820s or 1830s, recorded the presence of mummified remains.
