= Bay (chancellor) =

Ancient Egyptian treasurer (died 1192 BC)

- Chancellor
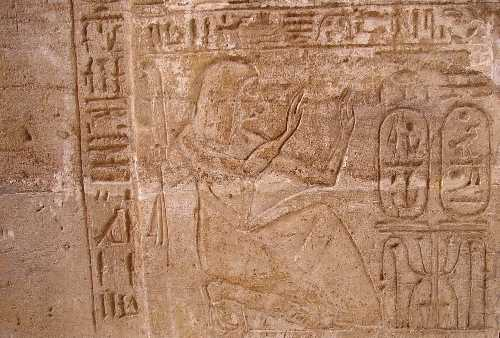
- Chancellor Bay on the doorjamb of the Amada temple, Nubia, shown adoring the cartouche of Siptah
- Dynasty: 19th Dynasty
- Pharaoh: Siptah
- Burial: KV13 (intended)

Bay, also called Ramesse Khamenteru (died 1192 BC), was an important Asiatic official in ancient Egypt, who rose to prominence and high office under Seti II Userkheperure Setepenre and later became an influential powerbroker in the closing stages of the 19th Dynasty. Bay's foreign origins and unusual "kingmaker" status may relate to near-contemporary references to a man named Irsu (alt. Arsu, Iarsu, Yarsu) mentioned in the Great Harris Papyrus. However, the association remains a matter of debate among specialists.

Bay's importance is emphasized by the fact that he was given permission, possibly by Seti II but more probably by Siptah, to construct his own tomb in Egypt's Valley of the Kings (KV13). His tomb was clearly constructed as part of a triad of tombs, including that of the Pharaoh Siptah and Queen Twosret. This was an unprecedented privilege, the likes of which were rarely accorded to a commoner, let alone a foreigner (though previous exceptions, such as that of Yuya, have occurred). It is possible that Bay was accorded this tomb because he was a relation of Siptah's mother, a Canaanite concubine of Seti II, or perhaps even of Amenmesse. His tomb was later usurped under the Twentieth Dynasty by princes Amenhirkopshef, a son of Ramesses III, and Mentuherkhepshef, a son of Ramesses VI.

== Origins and career ==
Bay is called a Syrian (Hurru = Hurrian or Harran-born) Asiatic. While his precise background is unknown except for his Syrian origins, Bay is first attested as scribe and butler, an important position in Egypt, during the reign of Seti II. However, Bay probably entered Egypt's civil administration earlier under a previous pharaoh–either Merneptah, Seti II's father, or Ramesses II.

Indeed, Bay's first official position may have been that of a priest in the temple at Heliopolis, where a small statue of him has been found. By the time of the death of Seti II, Bay had risen to the post of Chancellor and played the role of "kingmaker." Bay's status at Siptah's court was so great that on several of the young king's monuments, "the chancellor is shown in scenes with the pharaoh on the same scale as the latter, the earliest occasion in which a commoner was depicted in such a manner." Furthermore, Bay explicitly claims, in several inscriptions with reference to Siptah, that it was he who established the king "on the throne of his father" without providing further details on how this came about. Bay was also included in the cult of the mortuary temple of Siptah in Year 3 of the latter's reign. During the same period the tomb of Queen Twosret, KV14 was also started, and built as part of a threesome with those of Siptah and Bay. The tombs of Bay and Twosret (2nd building phase) are smaller copies of the royal tomb.

Images of Bay exist showing him standing behind the throne of Pharaoh Siptah, an unusual position for a commoner, and also opposite Twosret on the doorjamb of the Amada temple where he faces the queen. Tablets unearthed by excavators at Ras Shamra prove Ugarit was communicating with Bay of Egypt (RS 86.2230), who described himself the "head of the bodyguard of the Great King, the King of Egypt".

Like Siptah's and Twosret's, Bay's name was later removed from the tomb, probably by the new Pharaohs of the 20th Dynasty, who did not recognise his legitimacy, nor that of any of the late 19th Dynasty monarchs who ruled after Seti II, including Siptah and Amenmesse. If tradition is to be believed, Bay enjoyed an evil reputation: he reportedly seduced Twosret, who then gave him full control over Egypt's treasury. Some even speculate that during this period Bay and Twosret were lovers; though it is also hypothesized that for a powerful man to be involved with a vulnerable young woman, the relationship may not have been consensual. But this speculation is unlikely, since Bay died in Siptah's Year 5, at least two years before Twosret assumed the throne.

== Fate ==
While it was previously assumed that Bay served under Twosret and may even have attempted to usurp the throne on her demise, a newly discovered ostracon published by Pierre Grandet in BIFAO 100 titled "L'execution du chancelier Bay O. IFAO 1864," (BIFAO 100 [2000]: pp. 339–345), reveals otherwise. According to the information in Ostraca IFAO 1864, which is composed of two inscribed potsherd fragments that were reunited in February 2000, Bay was executed on or shortly before Year 5, III Shemu day 27 of Siptah, on the king's orders. The recto of the ostracon is essentially a public announcement to the workmen of Deir el-Medina and reads thus:

Year 5 III Shemu the 27th. On this day, the scribe of the tomb Paser came announcing 'Pharaoh LPH, has killed the great enemy Bay. (smꜣ Pr-ꜥꜣ ꜥ.w.s. ḫrw ꜥꜣ Bꜣy)

Although the king is not named, the dating of the ostracon under Siptah is certain and accords well with Bay's last known public appearance in Regnal Year 4 of this king. It is not known what event or palace conspiracy brought about Bay's sudden downfall. However, the prime beneficiary of his death appears to be Twosret, who assumed the throne without opposition a year later when Siptah died. The intention of the public announcement was to tell the Deir el-Medina workmen to abandon all work on completing Bay's tomb. Bay, hence, was not buried in the dignified style which he sought and instead met a traitor's fate. After his fall, his tomb was subsequently usurped in the 20th Dynasty for prince Mentuherkhepshef, a son of Rameses IX.

The ostracon's information was essentially a royal order for the workmen to stop all further work on Bay's tomb since the latter had now been deemed a traitor to the state. Aidan Dodson believes that Queen Tausret engineered Bay's downfall so that she would have total control at the palace court and need no longer share power with her political rival. As Dodson writes:

Although [this act was nominally] carried out in the name of the still young Siptah, one can probably safely assume that the initiative was taken by Tawosret, signaling her intention to share power no longer with her erstwhile colleague in regency [Bay]. While Bay’s name remained intact on many of his monuments, it was probably at this point that his extraordinary representations in the bark-shrine at Karnak were erased.

With Bay's demise, Twosret was the prime beneficiary of this major powerplay since Siptah was a sickly child ruler with a deformed left foot and a shortened left leg who died only one year later in his 6th year.

== Bibliography ==
- Clayton, Peter A. Chronicle of the Pharaohs (The Reign-By-Reign Record of the Rulers and Dynasties of Ancient Egypt) (ISBN 0-500-05074-0)
- Grimal, Nicolas. A History of Ancient Egypt. Blackwell Books, 1992, pp. 270–271.
- Pierre Grandet, "L'execution du chancelier Bay O. IFAO 1864 PDF," BIFAO 100 (2000), pp. 339–345
- Altenmüller, Hartwig, "Zweiter Vorbericht über die Arbeiten des Archäologischen Instituts der Universität Hamburg am Grab des Bay (KV 13) im Tal der Könige von Theben", SAK 19 (1992), 15–36.
- Tydlesey, Joyce. The Complete Queens of Egypt (American University of Cairo Press)
