= Amenherkhepshef =

- Prince of Egypt
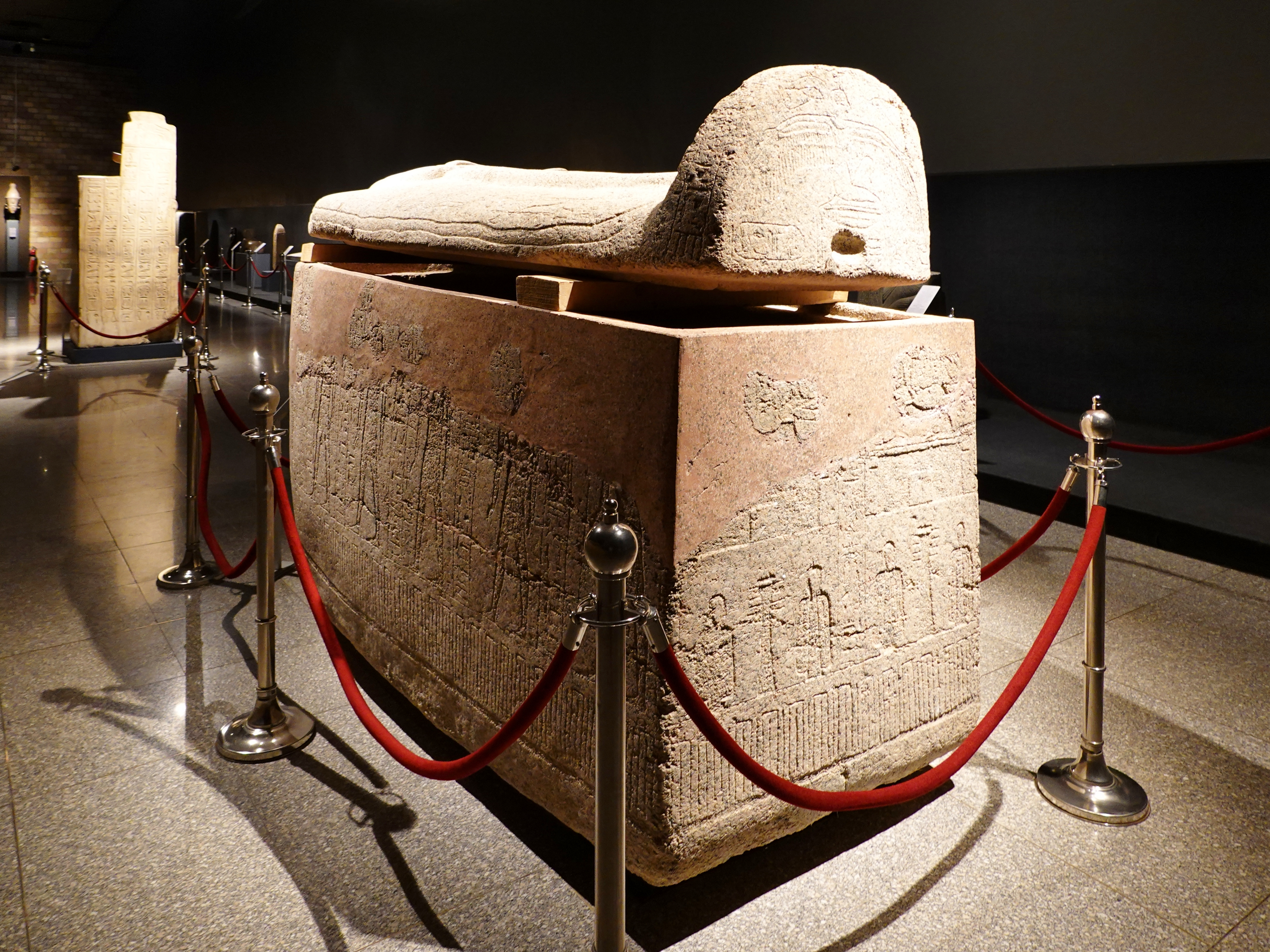
- Tausret's coffin, later usurped by prince Amunherkhepeshef for his burial.
- Burial: KV13, Thebes
Egyptian name
M17 Y5 N35 D2 Z1s F23 f A52Amenherkhepshef (Jmn ḥr ḫpš.f)
- Dynasty: 20th dynasty
- Father: Ramesses VI
- Mother: Nubkhesbed

Amenherkhepshef (also Amenherkhepshef D (Note: The "D" in this name is not part of the original Egyptian name, rather it is a denomination added in modern Egyptology to distinguish him from other people of the same name: Amenherkhepshef A, a son of Ramesses II, Amenherkhepshef B, a son of Ramesses III, and Amenherkhepshef C, Ramesses VI.) to distinguish him from earlier people of the same name) was an ancient Egyptian prince and a son of Ramesses VI with Queen Nubkhesbed. He lived in the mid 12th century BCE during the Twentieth Dynasty of the late New Kingdom period.

He died before his father and was buried in the reused sarcophagus of Tausret in an extension of the tomb originally planned for Chancellor Bay, KV13. The tomb is located in the Valley of the Kings, on the west bank of the Nile, in Thebes, Egypt.
