= KV14 =

Ancient Egyptian tomb in the Valley of the Kings

- Burial site of Tausert / Setnakhte
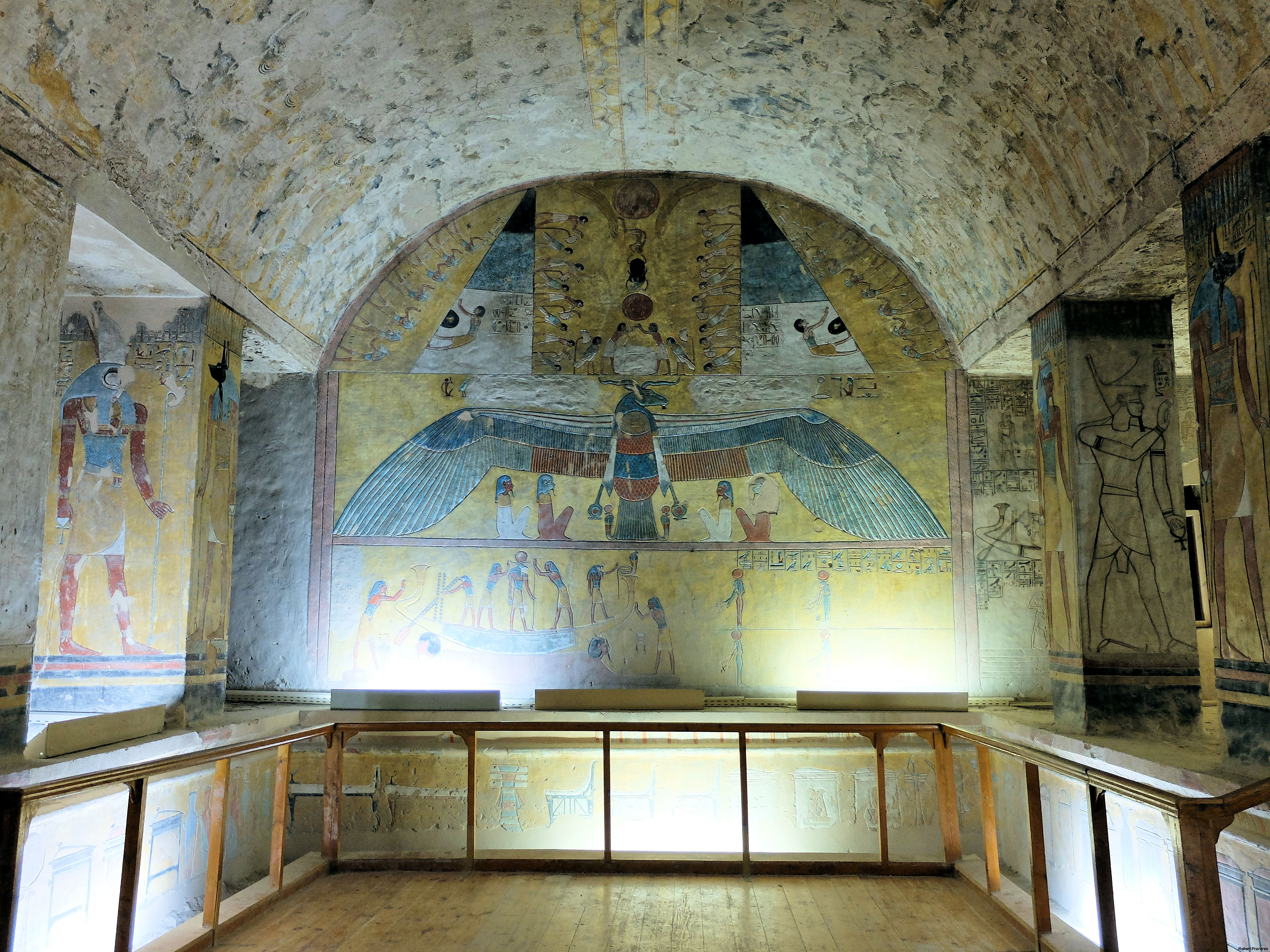

- Location within Egypt
- Coordinates: 25°44′19.9″N 32°35′59.1″E
- Location: East Valley of the Kings
- Discovered: Open in antiquity
- Excavated by: Hartwig Altenmüller (1983–1987)
- Decoration: Book of the Dead
- Layout: Straight axis
- ← Previous; KV13 Next → KV15

Tomb KV14 is a joint tomb, used originally by Tausert and then reused and extended by Setnakhte. It has been open since antiquity, but was not properly recorded until Hartwig Altenmüller excavated it from 1983 to 1987.

Located in the main body of the Valley of the Kings, it has two burial chambers, the later extensions making the tomb one of the largest of the Royal Tombs, at over 112 metres long.

The paintings are conventional depictions drawn from the Egyptian Litany of Re, Amduat and the Book of Gates. The original decoration showing the female Twosret was replaced with those of the male Setnakhte. Tausret's sarcophagus was later reused by prince Amenherkhepeshef in KV13, Setnakhte's sarcophagus remains in the tomb.

It is possible that Seti II was also buried in KV14 before being subsequently moved to the hastily finished KV15, perhaps by Setnakhte, in order to take over KV14 for his own tomb.

== Gallery ==
View of the burial chamber carved by Tausert, reused as a pillared chamber by Setnakhte

Another view of the burial chamber carved by Tausert, with the center 2 of the pillars featuring Sekhmet (center left) and Bastet (center right), having been usurped and reworked from 2 depictions of Tausert when turning the scenes into depictions of Setnakhte turned out to be too much work.

View of the burial chamber carved by Setnakhte, with the sarcophagus in the center

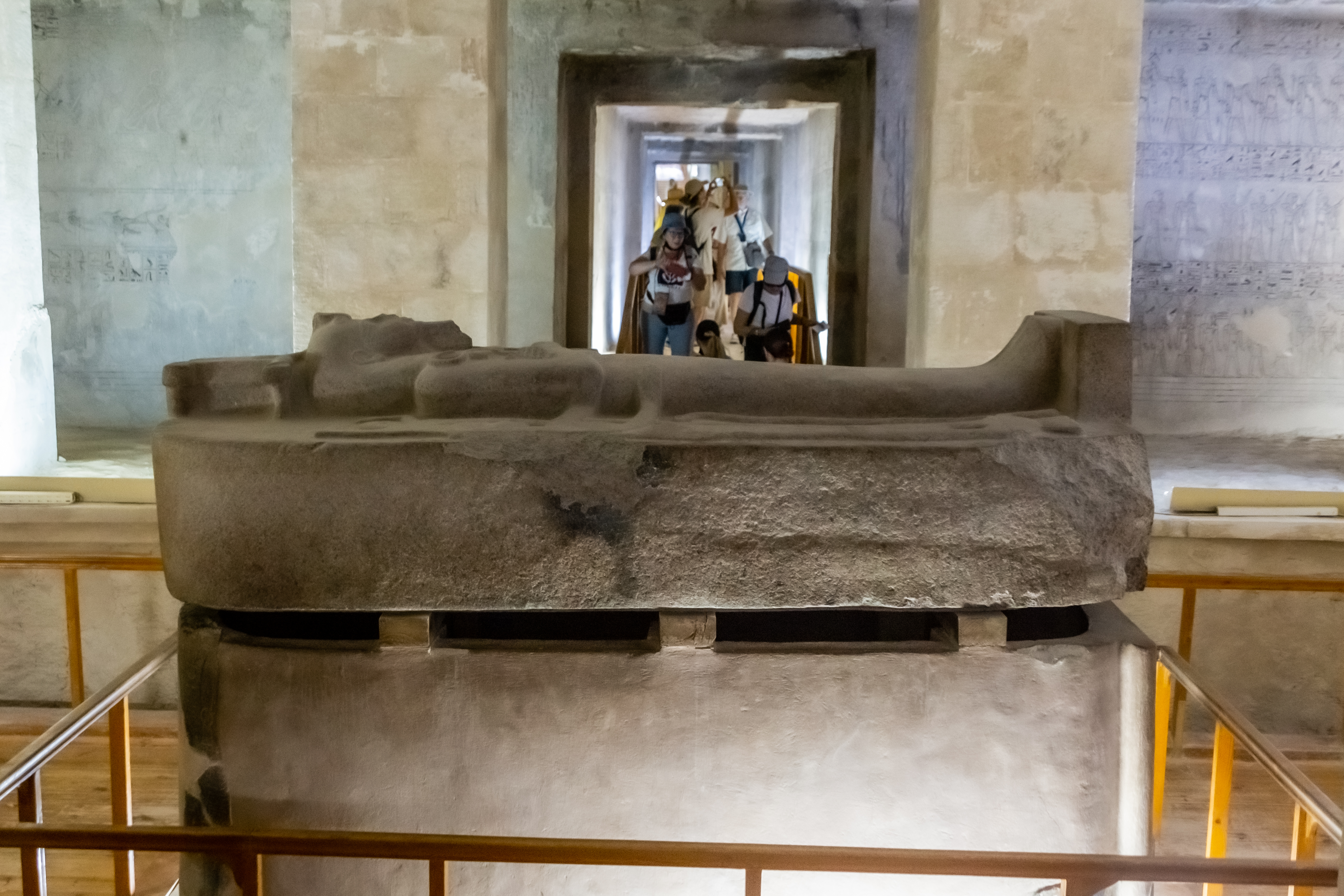
Sarcophagus view

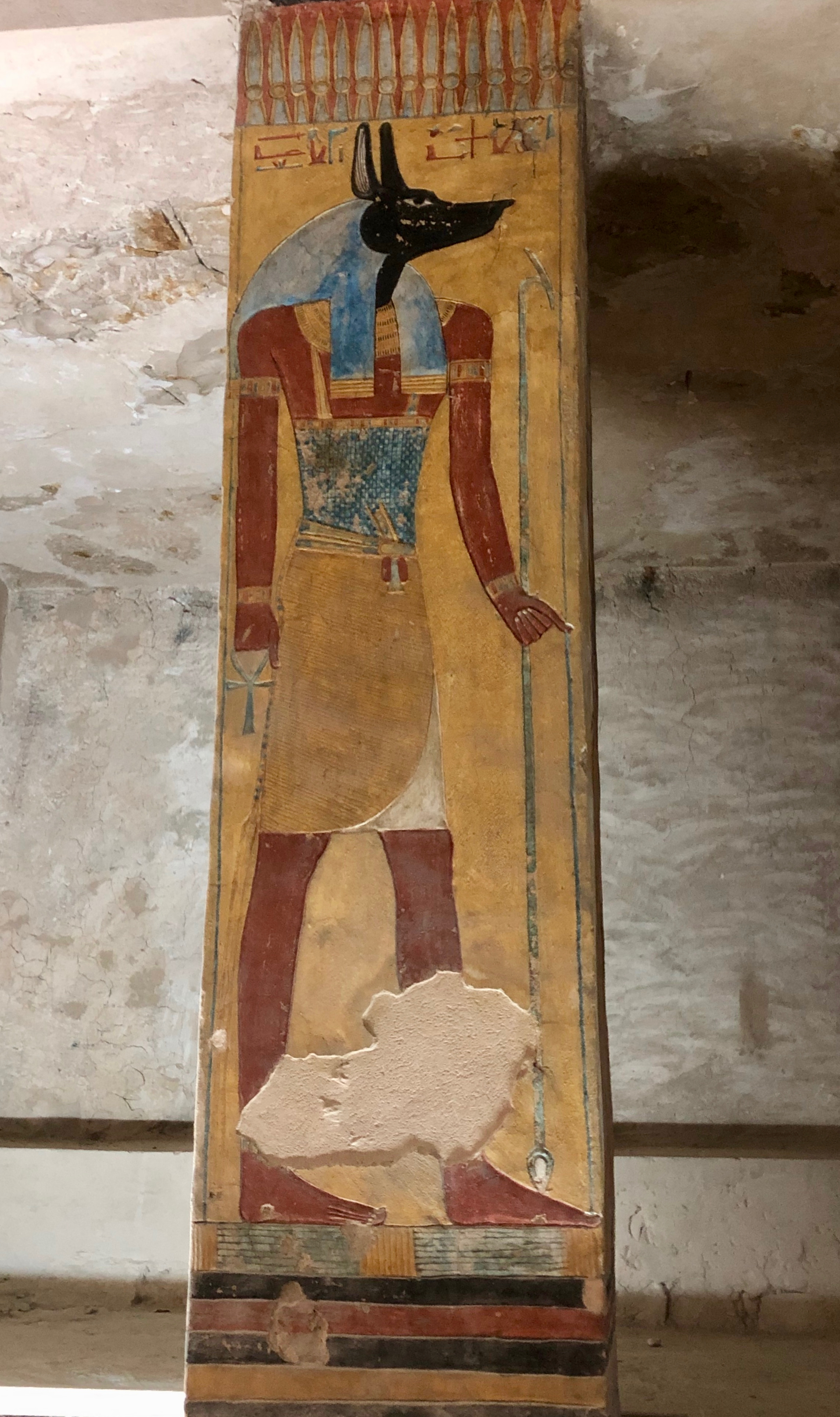
Anubis

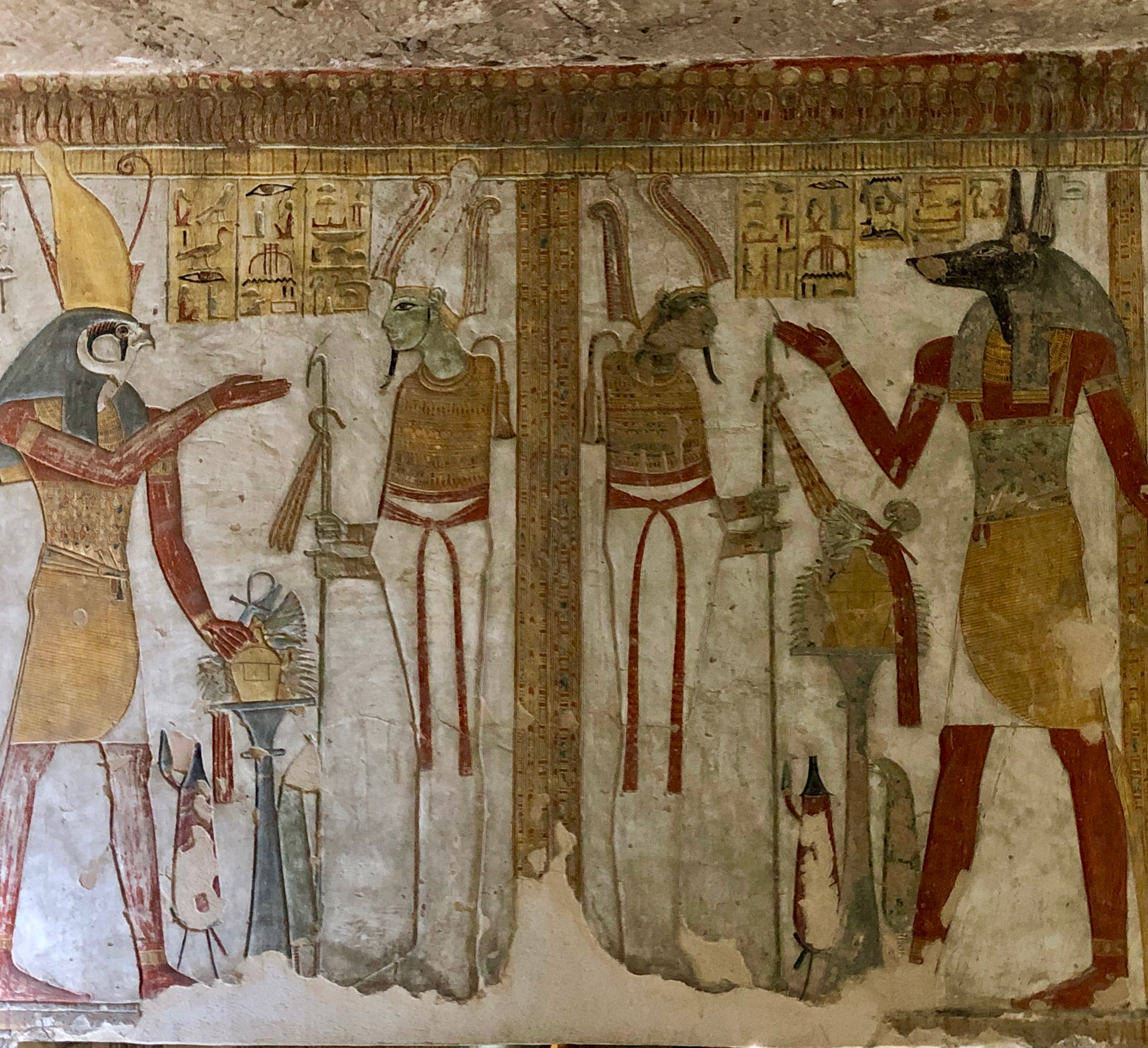
Horus and Anubis before Osiris

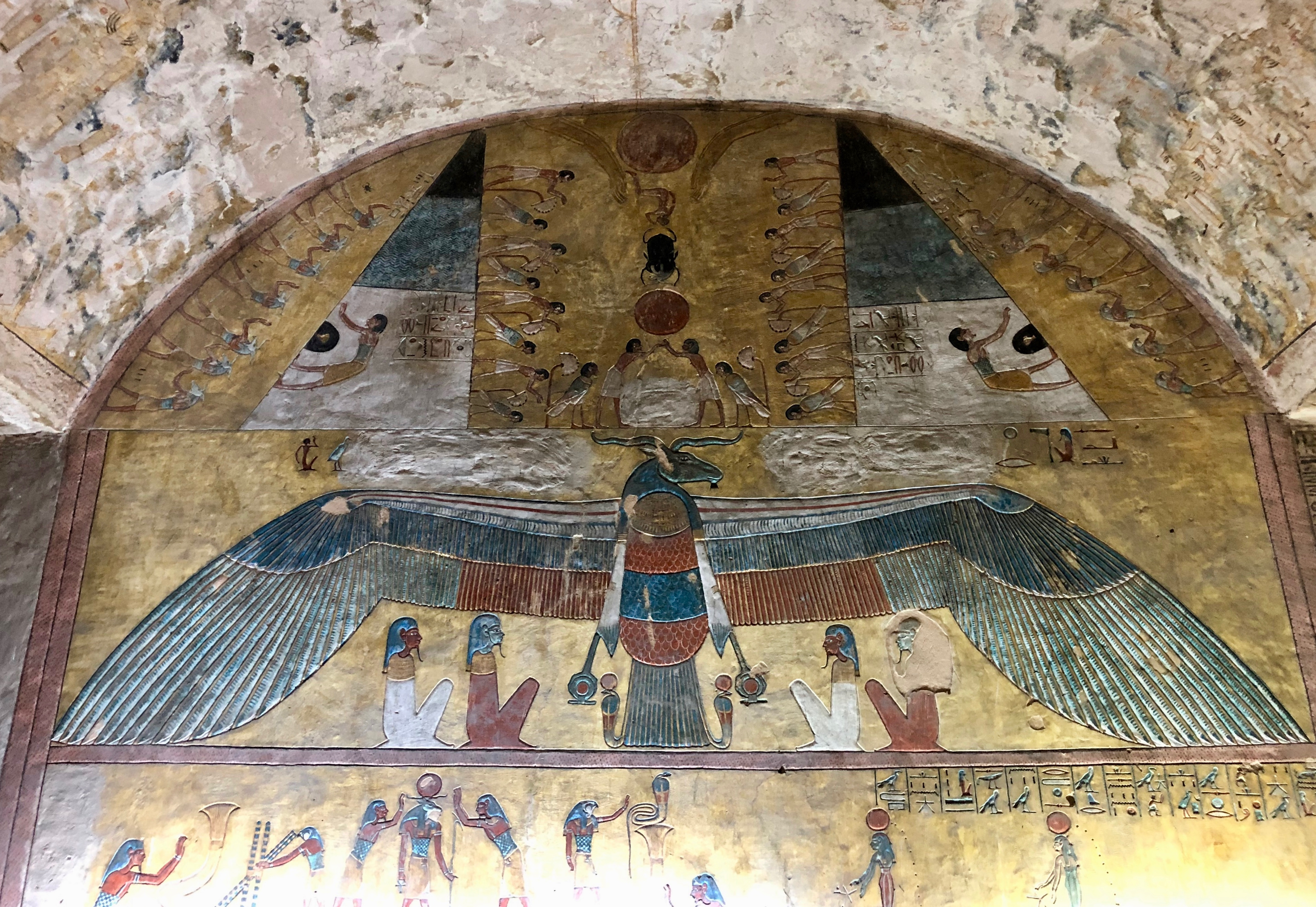
The Book of Caverns; the ba of Ra

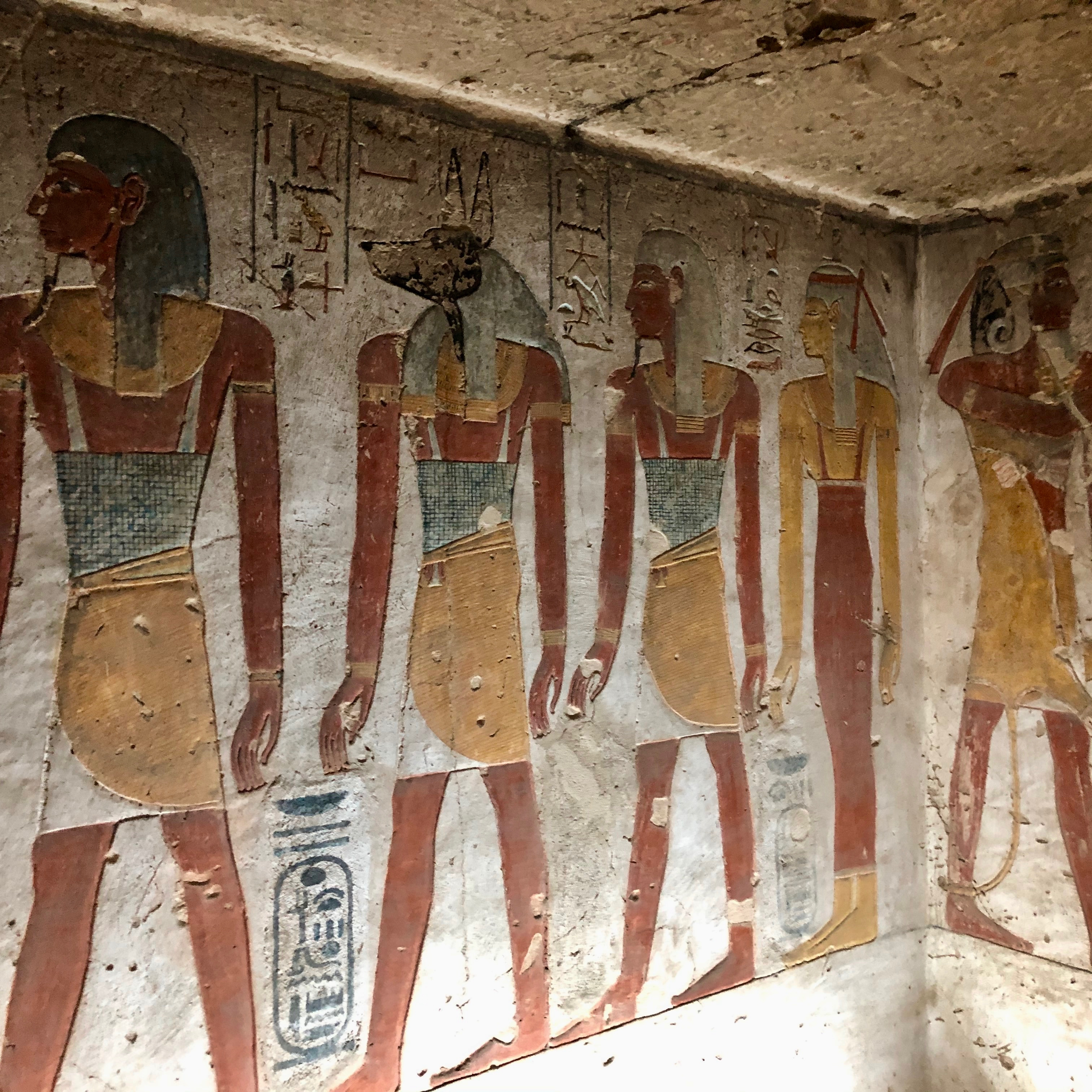
Imsety, Anubis, Duamutef, Isis, and Hor-Iunmutef

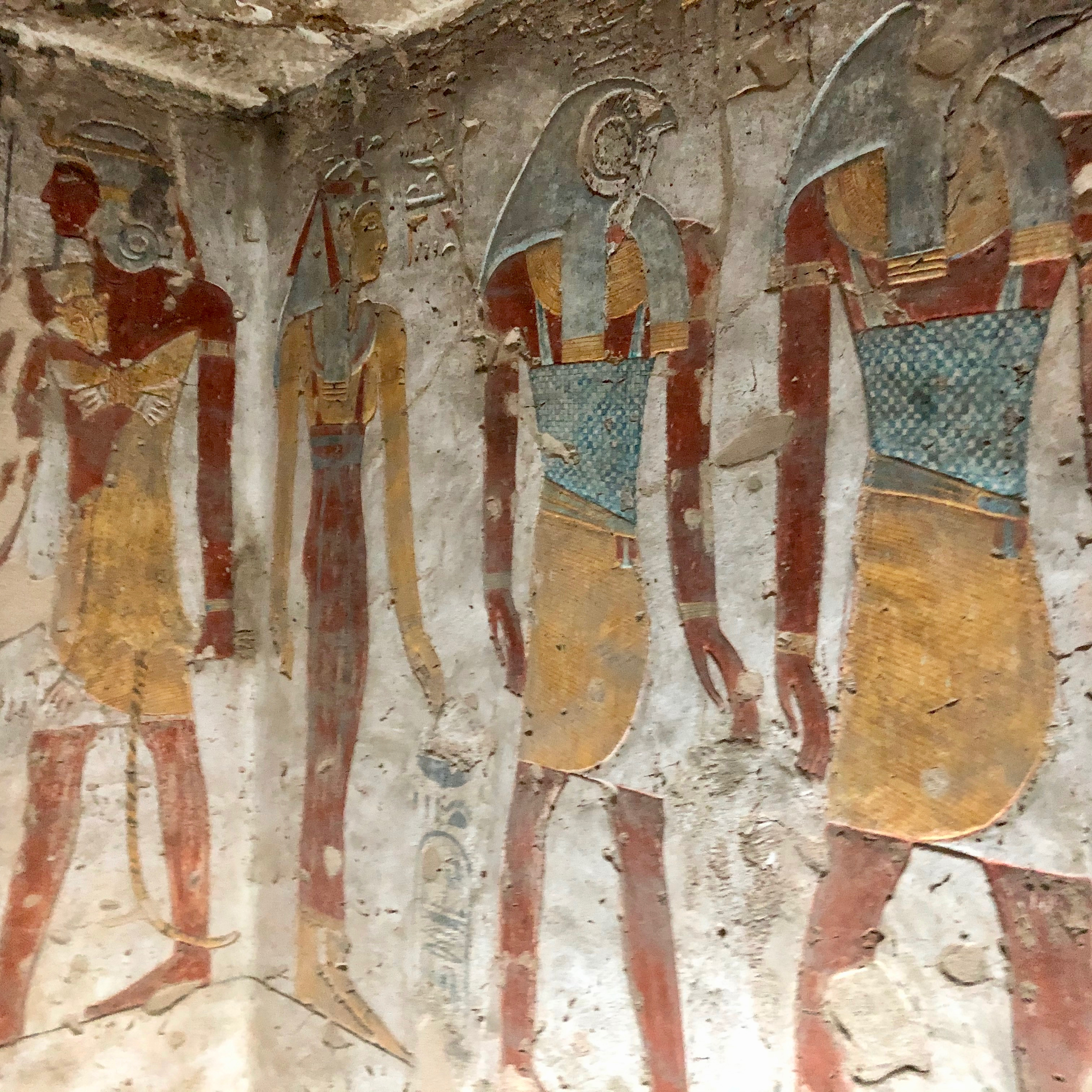
Hor-Iunmutef, Isis, Horus, and Anubis

Anubis mummying the dead

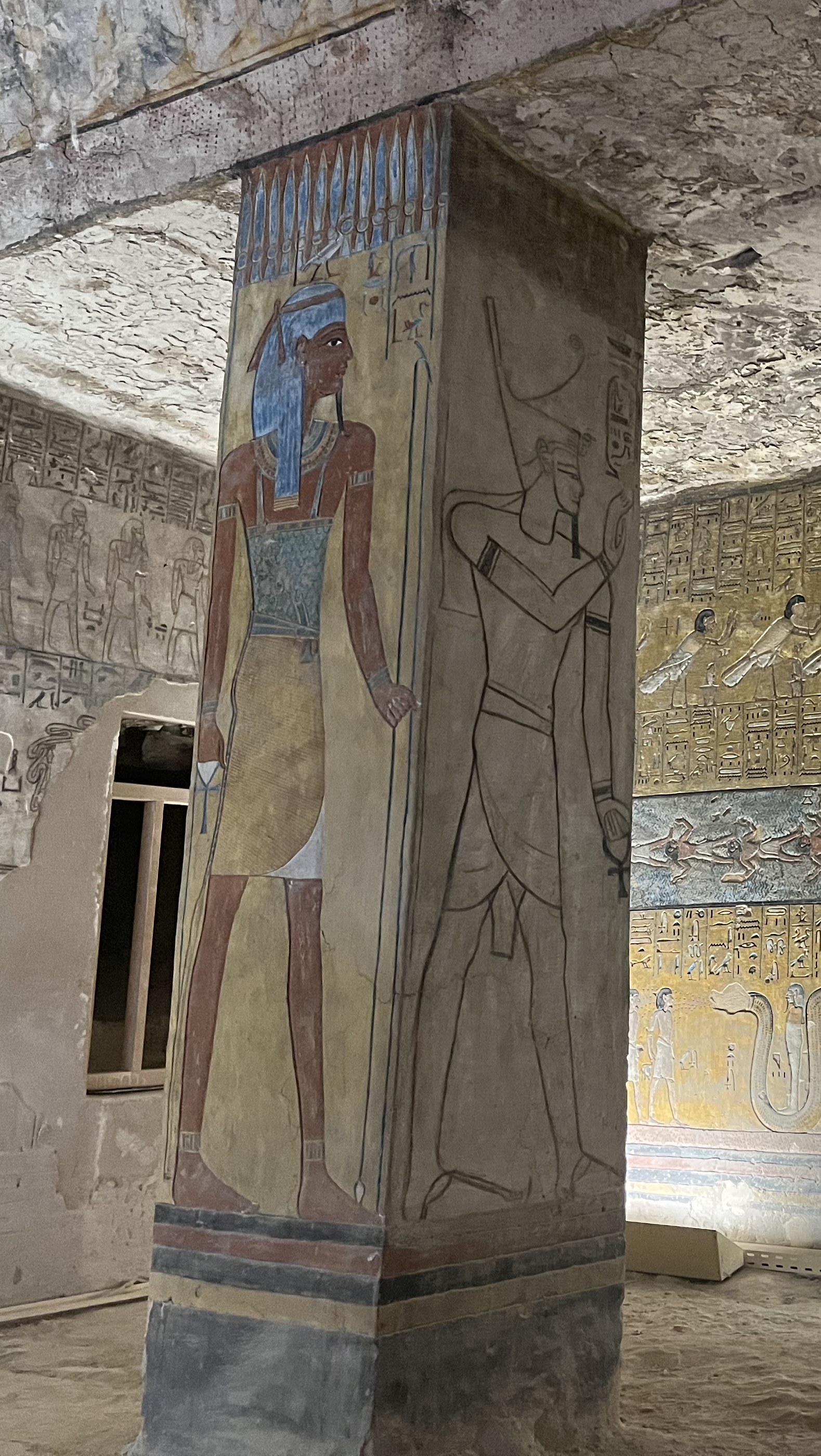
A column that had originally depicted Tausert, but was erased and repainted with a depiction of Setnakht in ink.

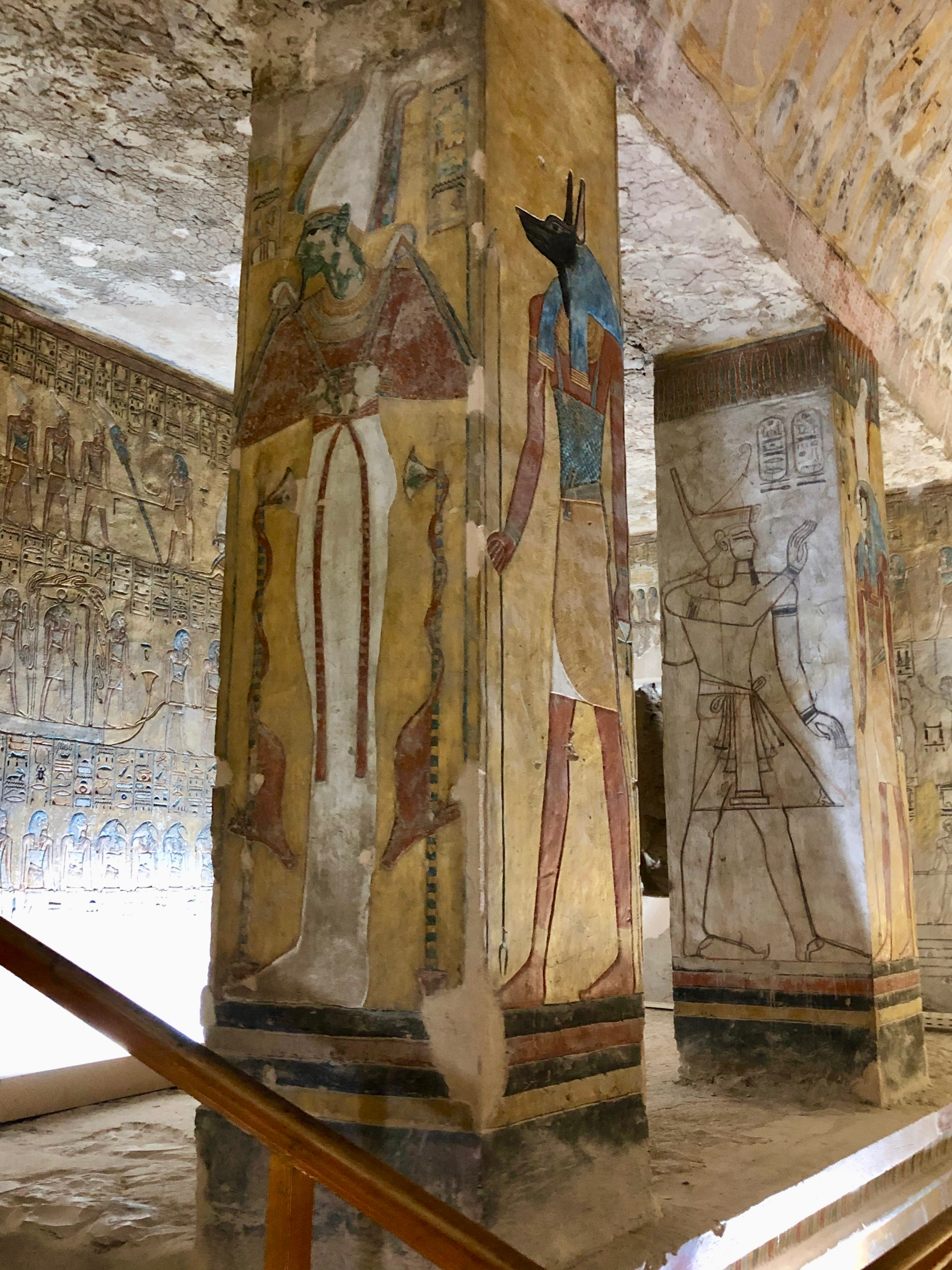
A column with Osiris and Anubis depicted on it. Behind them, the aformenthioned repainted column can be seen.

One of the unfinished walls of the tomb
