= Sources and parallels of the Exodus =

Historicity of Israelite founding myth

The Exodus is the founding myth of the Israelites. (Note: The name "exodus" is from Greek ἔξοδος exodos, "going out". For "myth" see Sparks, 2010, p. 73: "Charter (i.e., foundation) myths tell the story of a society's origins, and, in doing so, provide the ideological foundations for the culture and its institutions.") The scholarly consensus is that the Exodus, as exactly described in the Torah, is not historical, even though there is a historical core behind the Biblical narrative.

According to John J. Collins, there is no evidence that the Israelites were in ancient Egypt, and if there is any historical basis to the Exodus it can apply only to a small segment of the population of Israelites at large, as archaeologists believe they evolved within the land and culture of Canaan. Nevertheless, it is also commonly argued that some historical event may have inspired these traditions, even if Moses and the Exodus narrative belong to the collective cultural memory rather than history. According to Avraham Faust "most scholars agree that the narrative has a historical core, and that some of the highland settlers came, one way or another, from Egypt."

Egyptologist Jan Assmann suggests that the Exodus narrative combines, among other things, the expulsion of the Hyksos, the religious revolution of Akhenaten, the experiences of the Habiru (gangs of antisocial elements found throughout the ancient Near East), and the large-scale migrations of the Sea Peoples into "a coherent story that is fictional as to its composition but historical as to some of its components."

== Historicity of biblical account ==
The consensus of scholars who specialize on the problem of early Israelite settlers, is that the Biblical material does not give an accurate account of the emergence of Israel. Although some scholars view the exodus narrative as generally historically reliable while others see it as an invention with no historical value, most agree the narrative has a certain historical core.

While a few scholars continue to discuss the historicity, or at least plausibility, of the exodus story, the majority of archaeologists have abandoned it, in the phrase used by archaeologist William Dever, as "a fruitless pursuit".

The Torah lists the places where the Israelites rested. A few of the names at the start of the itinerary, including Ra'amses, Pithom and Succoth, are reasonably well identified with archaeological sites on the eastern edge of the Nile Delta, as is Kadesh-Barnea, where the Israelites spend 38 years after turning back from Canaan; other than these, very little is certain. The crossing of the Red Sea has been variously placed at the Pelusic branch of the Nile, anywhere along the network of Bitter Lakes and smaller canals that formed a barrier toward eastward escape, the Gulf of Suez (south-southeast of Succoth), and the Gulf of Aqaba (south of Ezion-Geber), or even on a lagoon on the Mediterranean coast. The biblical Mount Sinai is identified in Christian tradition with Jebel Musa in the south of the Sinai Peninsula, but this association dates only from the 3rd century CE, although a possible attestation of the placename "Sinai" in the south of the Sinai Peninsula has been identified in the itinerary of an Egyptian official of the 11th Dynasty.

=== Population ===
According to Exodus 12:37–38, the Israelites numbered "about six hundred thousand men on foot, besides women and children", plus the Erev Rav ("mixed multitude") and their livestock. Numbers 1:46 gives a more precise total of 603,550 men aged 20 and up. It is difficult to reconcile the idea of 600,000 Israelite fighting men with the information that the Israelites were afraid of the Philistines and Egyptians. The 600,000, plus wives, children, the elderly, and the "mixed multitude" of non-Israelites would have numbered some 2 to 2.5 million. Marching ten abreast, and without accounting for livestock, they would have formed a column 240 km (144 miles) long. At the traditional time-setting for this putative event, Egypt's population has been estimated to be in the range of 3 to 4.5 million. No evidence has been found that Egypt ever suffered the demographic and economic catastrophe such a loss of population would represent, nor that the Sinai desert ever hosted (or could have hosted) these millions of people and their herds. Some have rationalised the numbers into smaller figures, for example reading the Hebrew as "600 families" rather than 600,000 men, but all such solutions have their own set of problems.

=== Archeology ===
According to Carol Meyers, a century of research by archaeologists and Egyptologists has found no evidence which can be directly related to the Exodus captivity and the escape and travels through the wilderness. However, movements of small groups of Ancient Semitic-speaking peoples into and out of Egypt during the Eighteenth and Nineteenth Dynasties have been documented.

According to Israel Finkelstein in 2015, there is no indication that the Israelites ever lived in Ancient Egypt. The Sinai Peninsula shows almost no sign of any occupation for the entire 2nd millennium BCE (even Kadesh-Barnea, where the Israelites are said to have spent 38 years, was uninhabited prior to the early 12th century BCE).

Modern archaeologists believe that the Israelites were indigenous to Canaan. The culture of the earliest Israelite settlements is Canaanite, their cult-objects are those of the Canaanite god El, the pottery remains are in the Canaanite tradition, and the alphabet used is early Canaanite. Although some recent scholarship has argued for Egyptian influence in early Israelite culture, almost the sole marker distinguishing the "Israelite" villages from Canaanite sites is an absence of pig bones, although whether even this is an ethnic marker or is due to other factors remains a matter of dispute.

=== Possible Anachronisms and Egyptian elements ===
Scholars are divided regarding the degree of familiarity with ancient Egypt that is reflected in the Biblical account. Gary A. Rendsburg points to a number of highly specific elements of the Biblical story (including the turning of an inanimate object into a reptile, a curse of three days of darkness, and the killing of the firstborn at night) that repeat motifs that are known from Egyptian culture and from no other ancient Near East society. On the other hand, Pamela Barnash asserts that while the biblical narrative contains some authentically Egyptian details, such details are "scant", and the story frequently does not reflect Egypt of the Late Bronze Age or even Egypt at all (it is unlikely, for example, that a mother would place a baby in the reeds of the Nile, where it would be in danger from crocodiles). Such elements of the narrative as can be fitted into the 2nd millennium could equally belong to the 1st, consistent with a 1st millennium BCE writer trying to set an old story in Egypt.

Details point to a 1st millennium date for the composition of the narrative: Ezion-Geber (one of the Stations of the Exodus), for example, dates to a period between the 8th and 6th centuries BCE with a possible period of occupation in the 12th century BCE, and those place-names on the Exodus route which have been identified – Goshen, Pithom, Succoth, Ramesses and Kadesh Barnea – as existing in the 2nd millennium BCE can also be placed in the 1st millennium BCE. Similarly, Pharaoh's fear that the Israelites might ally themselves with foreign invaders seems unlikely in the context of the late 2nd millennium, when Canaan was part of an Egyptian empire and Egypt faced no enemies in that direction, but does make sense in a 1st millennium context, when Egypt was considerably weaker and faced invasion first from the Achaemenid Empire and later from the Seleucid Empire.

The mention of the dromedary in Exodus 9:3 also suggests a later date – the widespread domestication of the camel as a herd animal is thought not to have taken place before the late 2nd millennium, after the Israelites had already emerged in Canaan, and they did not become widespread in Egypt until c. 200–100 BCE. However some scholars have pointed out that it is possible that camel pastoralists could have entered Egypt; also the mention of camels in the exodus narrative only refers to the livestock owned by the Pharaoh who were at risk due to the plagues, the narrative indicates that camels had little economic importance compared to other livestock, and there is no mention of Israelites or Egyptians riding camels.

=== Chronology ===
The chronology of the Exodus narrative is symbolic: for example, its culminating event, the erection of the Tabernacle as Yahweh's dwelling-place among his people, occurs in the year 2666 Anno Mundi (Year of the World, meaning 2666 years after God creates the world), and two-thirds of the way through a four thousand year era which culminates in or around the re-dedication of the Second Temple in 164 BCE. As a result, attempts to date the event to a specific century in known history have been inconclusive. 1 Kings 6:1 places it 480 years before the construction of Solomon's Temple, implying an Exodus at c. 1450 BCE, but the number is rhetorical rather than historical, representing a symbolic twelve generations of forty years each. In any case, Canaan at this time was part of the Egyptian empire, so that the Israelites would in effect be escaping from Egypt to Egypt, and its cities do not show destruction layers consistent with the Book of Joshua's account of the occupation of the land. According to Finkelstein and Silberman, Jericho was "small and poor, almost insignificant, and unfortified (and) [t]here was also no sign of a destruction." William F. Albright, the leading biblical archaeologist of the mid-20th century, proposed a date of around 1250–1200 BCE, but his so-called "Israelite" markers (four-roomed houses, collar-rimmed jars, etc.) are continuations of Canaanite culture. According to Ann E. Killebrew, the lack of evidence has led scholars to conclude that the Exodus story does not represent a specific historical moment but rather a collection of exoduses of runaway Asiatic slaves. Killebrew suggested it reflected a memory of Egyptian occupation of Canaan and the enslavement of its population which was at its greatest extent in the 13th-12th century BCE.

== The expulsion of the Hyksos ==
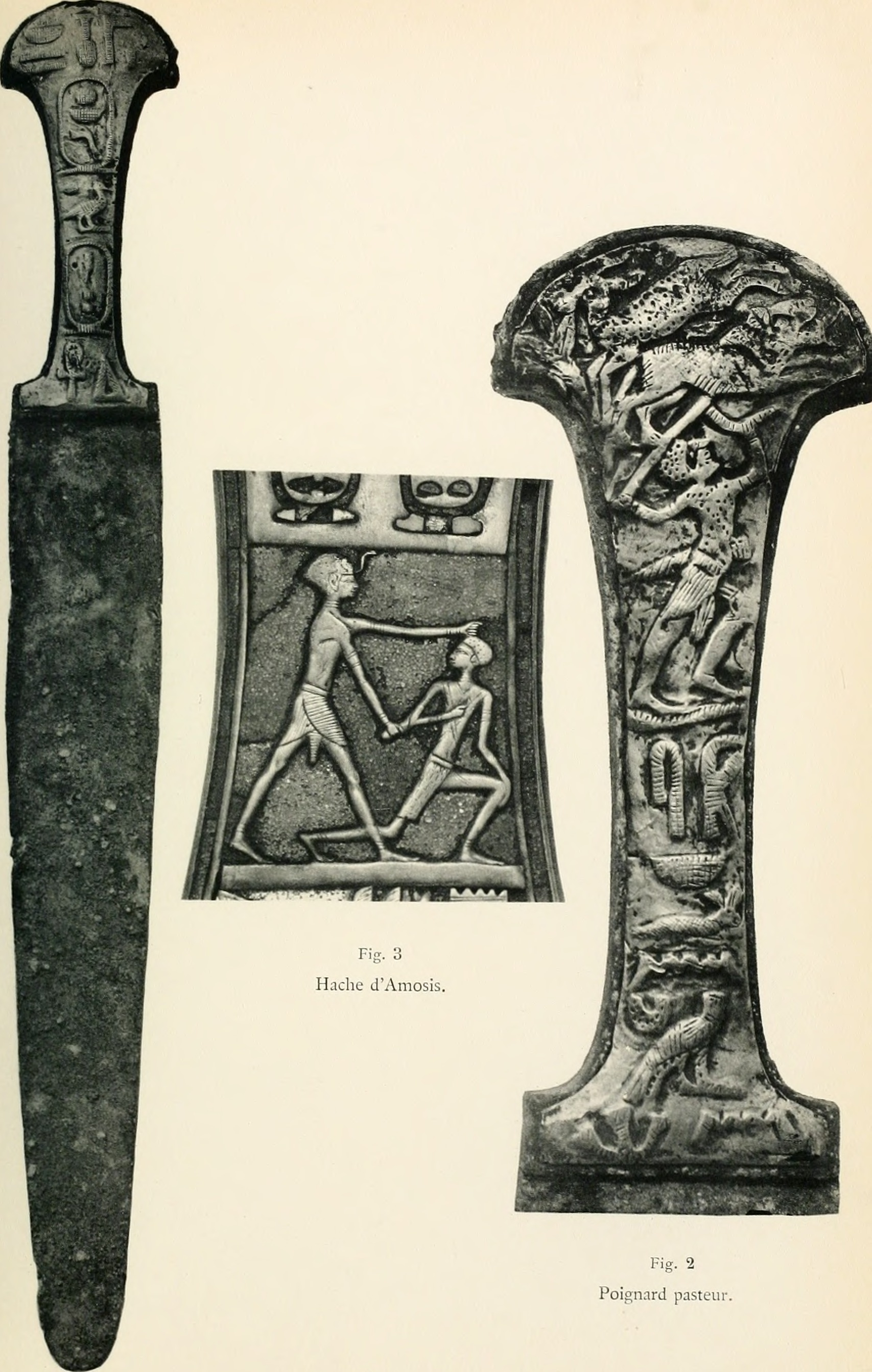
Ahmose slaying a Hyksos (center)

The Hyksos were a Semitic people whose arrival and departure from Ancient Egypt has sometimes been seen as broadly parallel to the biblical tale of the sojourn of the Israelites in Egypt. Canaanite populations first appeared in Egypt towards the end of the 12th Dynasty c. 1800 BCE, and either around that time, or c. 1720 BCE, established an independent realm in the eastern Nile Delta. In about 1650 BCE, this realm was assumed by the rulers known as the Hyksos, who formed the 15th Dynasty of Egyptian pharaohs.

It has been claimed that new revolutionary methods of warfare ensured for the Hyksos their ascendancy, in their influx into the new emporia being established in Egypt's delta and at Thebes in support of the Red Sea trade. However, in recent years the idea of a simple Hyksos migration, with little or no war, has gained support.

In any case, the 16th Dynasty and the 17th Dynasty continued to rule in Upper Egypt (southern Egypt) in co-existence with the Hyksos kings, perhaps as their vassals. Eventually, Seqenenre Tao, Kamose and Ahmose I waged war against the Hyksos and expelled Khamudi, their last king, from Egypt c. 1550 BCE.

The saga of the Hyksos was recorded by the Egyptian historian Manetho (3rd century BCE), chief priest at the Temple of Ra in Heliopolis, and is preserved in three quotations by the 1st century CE Jewish historian Titus Flavius Josephus. In Manetho's lost Aegyptiaca—according to Josephus—Manetho describes the Hyksos, their lowly origins in Asia, their invasion and dominion over Egypt, their eventual expulsion, and their subsequent exile to Judea and their establishing the city of Jerusalem and its temple. Manetho defined the Hyksos as being the "Shepherd Kings" or "Captive Shepherds" who invaded Egypt, destroying its cities and temples and making war with the Egyptian people to "gradually destroy them to the very roots". Following a war with the Egyptians a treaty was negotiated stipulating that these Hyksos Shepherds were to exit Egypt.

Josephus said that Manetho's Hyksos narrative was a reliable Egyptian account about the Israelite Exodus, and that the Hyksos were 'our people'. Donald Redford said that the Exodus narrative is a Canaanite memory of the Hyksos' descent and occupation of Egypt. Archaeologists Israel Finkelstein and Neil Asher Silberman argued that the exodus narrative perhaps evolved from vague memories of the Hyksos expulsion, spun to encourage resistance to the 7th century domination of Judah by Egypt. Jan Assmann said the biblical narrative is more like a counterhistory: "It turns kings into slaves; an expulsion into a ban on emigration; a descent from the Egyptian throne to insignificance into an ascent from oppression to freedom as god's chosen people."

There is a current scholarly consensus that if the Israelites did emerge from Egypt, it must have occurred sometime during the 13th century BCE, because there is no archaeological evidence of any distinctive Israelite material culture before that time. Nevertheless, many recent scholars have posited that the Exodus narrative may have developed from collective memories of Hyksos expulsions from Egypt, and possibly elaborated on to encourage resistance to the 7th century domination of Judah by Egypt.

== Minoan eruption ==
In her book The Parting of the Sea: How Volcanoes, Earthquakes, and Plagues Shaped the Story of the Exodus, geologist Barbara J. Sivertsen explores links between the biblical Exodus narrative, the Hyksos expulsion, and the Minoan (Thera) volcanic eruption c. 1600 BCE. Apocalyptic rainstorms, which devastated much of Egypt, and were described on the Tempest Stele of Ahmose I, pharaoh of the Hyksos expulsion, have been attributed to short-term climatic changes caused by the Theran eruption. While it has been argued that the damage attributed to this storm may have been caused by an earthquake following the Thera Eruption, it has also been suggested that it was caused during a war with the Hyksos, and the storm reference is merely a metaphor for chaos upon which the Pharaoh was attempting to impose order. Documents such as Hatshepsut's Speos Artemidos depict storms, but are clearly figurative not literal. Research indicates that the Speos Artemidos stele is a reference to her overcoming the powers of chaos and darkness.

== Syro-Palestinian, as opposed to Egyptian, pre-exilic period regional paradigm for understanding traditions ==
In his book Images of Egypt in Early Biblical Literature, Hebrew Bible historian Stephen C. Russell explores links between the differing scriptural portrayals of the biblical Exodus narrative and geopolitical forces in Cisjordan Israel, Transjordan Israel, and Judah in the 8th century BCE contributing to their development. This methodology allows for accommodating seemingly paradoxical "[post-exilic] reshap[ing] of [the traditions about Egypt and the Exodus]" by emphasizing immediately antecedent geopolitical settings. When reconciling "the [E]xodus [suggesting to have been] a northern, Israelite idea" according to Israeli Bible researcher Yair Hoffman, with the Northern Kingdom being the most geographically distant location relative to Egypt inhabited by the Israelites, the southerners gave less credence historicity wise to that of the northerner's Exodus narrative: "There is no explicit evidence in Hosea and Amos that Israel's time in Egypt was remembered as a period of slavery." Not agreeing on all historical facts, the difference becomes more clear ideologically. Russell notes the southerners express skepticism towards election theology in which northerners regard "Yahweh's saving act in the exodus as signifying his unique relationship to Israel." Aside from direct use of scripture from the book of Amos, Russel also presents differing Hiphel use as evidence. Rather than a push from Egypt, their Exodus narrative more resembles a pull into Israel. Possible places of banishment from Israel, in the book of Hosea, are listed as Assyria and a repeat use of Egypt, with destination-agnostic harms of foreign interference in religious practices and perishing outside of divinely bestowed territory predicted as a result. "This perspective, in which Israel is rooted in its land, is also reflected in the prophetic threats of exile[, whereupon] the use of both threats in poetic parallelism [is then interpreted] as suggesting the primary threat was that Israel would be away from its own land, regardless of the actual destination of exile."

== Akhenaten and the end of the Amarna period ==
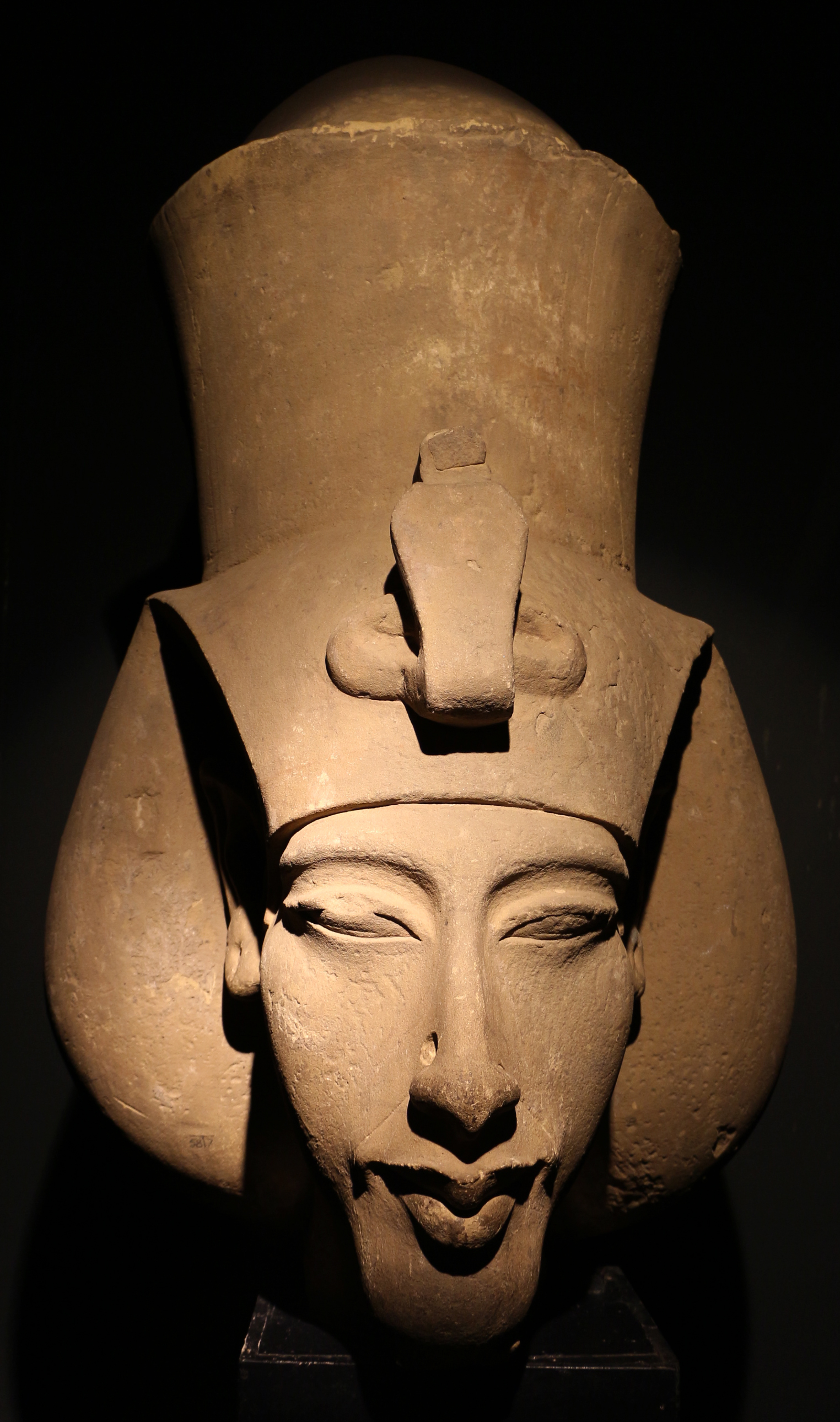
Statue head of Akhenaten

Akhenaten, also known as Amenhotep IV, was an ancient Egyptian pharaoh of the 18th Dynasty (reigned c. 1353-1336 BCE). This Pharaoh presided over radical changes in Egyptian religious practices. He established a form of solar monotheism or monolatry based on the cult of Aten, and disbanded the priesthoods of all other gods. His new capital, Akhetaten or 'Horizon of Aten', was built at the site known today as Amarna. The city was built hastily, mostly using mud bricks. After Akhenaten's death, it was abandoned. The temples, shrines, and royal statues were razed later, during the reign of Horemheb.

The idea of Akhenaten as the pioneer of a monotheistic religion that later became Judaism has been considered by various scholars. One of the first to mention this was Sigmund Freud, the founder of psychoanalysis, in his book Moses and Monotheism. Basing his arguments on a belief that the Exodus story was historical, Freud argued that Moses had been an Atenist priest forced to leave Egypt with his followers after Akhenaten's death. Freud argued that Akhenaten was striving to promote monotheism, something that the biblical Moses was able to achieve.

In 1973, William F. Albright noted that Moses and many of his family members had Egyptian names, and said that there is no good reason to deny that Moses was influenced by the monotheism of Akhenaten. However, Donald Redford said that there is little evidence that Akhenaten was a progenitor of Biblical monotheism. To the contrary, he has asserted that the religion of the Hebrew Bible had its own separate development beginning 500 years later.

== The Ramesside Period ==
Most scholars who accept that some sort of exodus happened date this event to either the thirteenth century BCE at the time of Ramesses II, or during the twelfth century BCE at the time of Ramesses III.

One text of this period which has been connected to the Exodus narrative is Papyrus Leiden 348, which refers to construction works at Pi-Ramesses (Biblical Rameses). One section of this papyrus contains the order “Issue grain to the men of the army and (to) the ʿApiru who are drawing stone for the great pylon of the [...] of Ramesses.” Many scholars have suggested a linguistic connection between the terms 'Apiru (or Habiru) and Hebrews, so this text may provide a possible (yet uncertain) reference to some proto-Israelites doing construction work at Pi-Ramesses during this period.

Another possible evidence for the presence of proto-Israelites in Egypt from this period are two four-room houses discovered at Medinet Habu. Scholars Manfred Bietak and Gary Rendsburg have pointed out that the four-room house is commonly considered to be a distinctive Israelite cultural marker, suggesting that the Semitic settlers in those houses may have been related to the early Israelites. They reference Papyrus Harris I, where Ramesses III records defeating Shasu tribes of Se'ir and taking them captive as temple workmen.

Bietak and Rendsburg have also argued that another possible parallel to the Exodus narrative may be Papyrus Anastasi V. This papyrus, which dates to the reign of Seti II, contains a report from a frontier official referring to two slaves escaping from Egypt through the cities of Succoth and Migdol (two places mentioned in the Biblical account) and into the desert. Bitetak and Rendsburg hold that this parallel "suggests that the Israelites were using a route well traveled by fugitive slaves, somewhat akin to the “underground railroad” of American history".

Biblical scholar Graham I. Davies notes that several literary texts from Ancient Egypt document the presence of 'Apiru peoples working on building projects during the 19th Dynasty of Egypt, suggesting a possible connection with the account of Israelite servitude to the Egyptians. Ziony Zevit argues that the Bible's depiction of Israelite servitude accords with what it is known about slavery in ancient Egypt.

Another scholar who places the Exodus in this period is Richard Elliott Friedman. He argues that the Tribe of Levi were the only ones to escape from Egypt in the Exodus, during the reign of either Pharaoh Ramesses II or his son, Pharaoh Merneptah. The tribe brought Yahweh to Canaan, who later merged with the Canaanite god El. Friedman is not sure where the Levites got Yahweh from, although he hypothesizes either from the Shasu deity Yhw, or potentially in Midian. He argues this was a crucial step in the innovation of monotheism. Friedman also argues that most of the Levites in the story, like Moses, Aaron, and Phinehas have names that may have originated in Egypt. He also argues that the Song of the Sea (Exodus 15:1-15:18) and the Song of Deborah (Judges 5:2-5:31) are the two oldest works in the Bible. The Song of the Sea doesn't mention a number of people going out of Egypt, rather a nation led by Yahweh. He also points out the Song of Deborah doesn't mention the Levites as one of the tribes of Israel, perhaps because they were still in Egypt. Lastly, Friedman points to the similarities between the Tabernacle and the Battle Tent of Ramesses II.

== Egyptian and Hellenistic parallels ==
Several ancient non-biblical sources seem to parallel the biblical Exodus narrative or the events which occurred at the end of the eighteenth dynasty when the new religion of Akhenaten was denounced and his capital city of Amarna was abandoned. These tales often combine elements of the Hyksos expulsion. For example, Hecataeus of Abdera (c. 320 BCE) tells how the Egyptians blamed a plague on foreigners and expelled them from the country, whereupon Moses, their leader, took them to Canaan. There are more than a dozen versions of this story, all of them adding more detail, most of them profoundly anti-Jewish. Manetho tells how 80,000 lepers and other "impure people", led by a priest named Osarseph, join forces with the former Hyksos, now living in Jerusalem, to take over Egypt. They wreak havoc until eventually the pharaoh and his son chase them out to the borders of Syria, where Osarseph gives the lepers a law-code and changes his name to Moses, although the identification of Osarseph with Moses in the second account may be a later addition. Josephus vehemently disagreed with the claim that the Israelites were connected with Manetho's story about Osarseph and the lepers. The stories told by Hecataeus and Manetho seem to be related in some way to that of the Exodus, although it is impossible to tell whether they both bear witness to historical events, or Manetho is a polemical response to the Exodus story, or the Exodus story a response to the Egyptian stories.

Three interpretations have been proposed for Manetho's story of Osarseph and the lepers: the first, as a memory of the Amarna period; the second, as a memory of the Hyksos; and the third, as an anti-Jewish propaganda. Each explanation has evidence to support it: the name of the pharaoh, Amenophis, and the religious character of the conflict fit the Amarna reform of Egyptian religion; the name of Avaris and possibly the name Osarseph fit the Hyksos period; and the overall plot is an apparent inversion of the Jewish story of the Exodus casting the Jews in a bad light. No one theory, however, can explain all the elements. A proposal by Egyptologist Jan Assmann suggests that the story has no single origin but rather combines numerous historical experiences, notably the Amarna and Hyksos periods, into a folk memory.
