= Israel Knohl =

Israeli Bible scholar and historian (born 1952)

- ישראל קנוהל
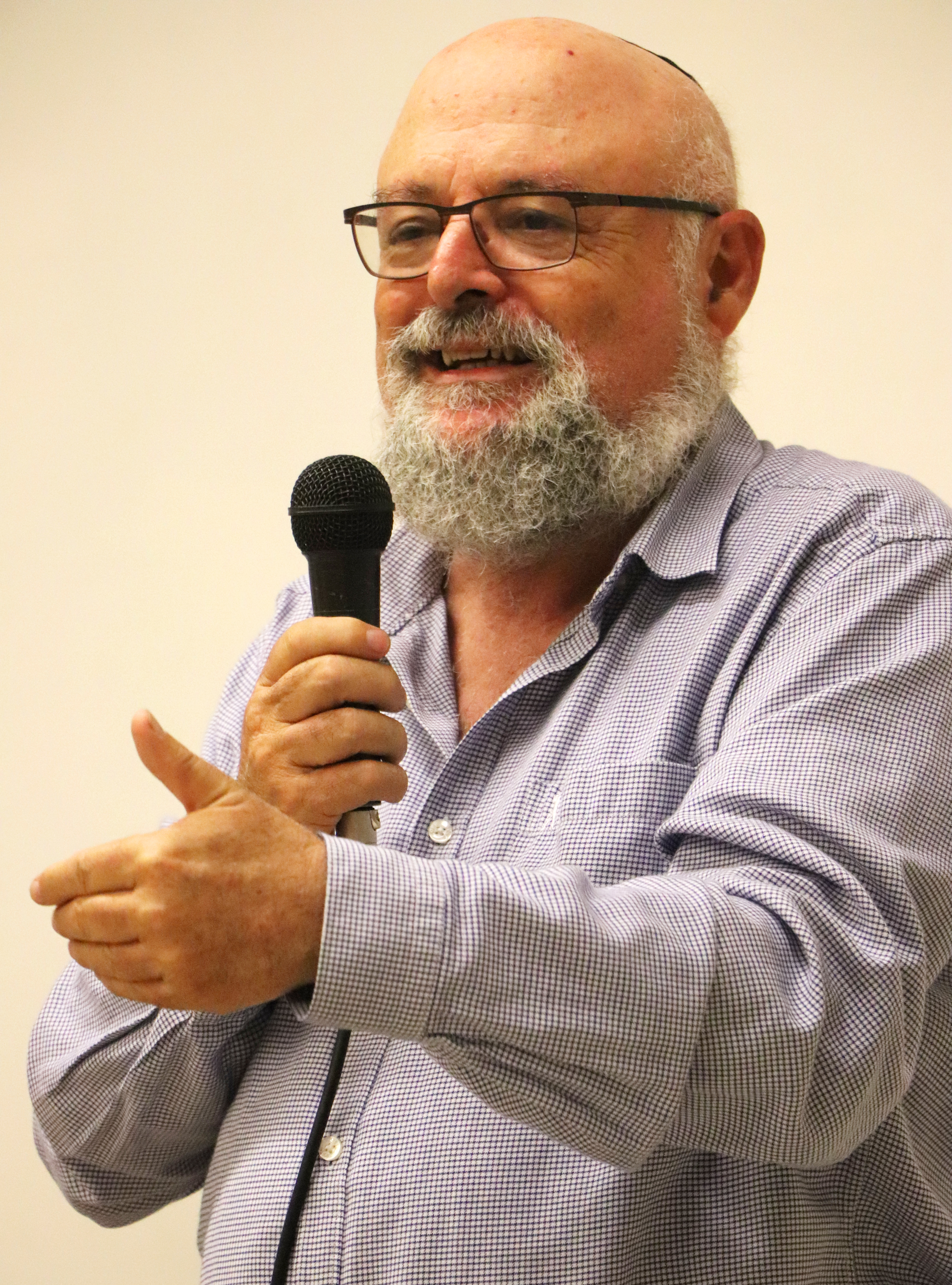
- Born: March 13, 1952 (age 74)
- Occupation: Biblical scholar
- Children: 3

Israel Knohl (Hebrew: ישראל קנוהל; born 13 March 1952) is an Israeli Bible scholar and historian. He is the Yehezkel Kaufmann Professor of Biblical studies at the Hebrew University of Jerusalem and a Senior Fellow at Shalom Hartman Institute in Jerusalem. His books deal with the integration of scientific and archaeological discoveries with the biblical account, early Israelite beliefs, a survey of Israelite cult, and how and where the Israelites originated.

== Biography ==
Israel Knohl was born in Giv'at Aliyah, Israel. After serving in the Israel Defense Forces (IDF) he completed a Bachelor's degree in the Talmud Department at the Hebrew University of Jerusalem. For his graduate work he switched to the Bible Department and completed his PhD in 1988 under the supervision of Moshe Greenberg, with a dissertation on the relationship between the Pentateuchal Priestly source and the Holiness code.

Knohl lives in Jerusalem and is the father of the three children. His brother, Elyashiv Knohl, was the rabbi of Kibbutz Kfar Etzion.

== Academic career ==
Following a postdoctoral fellowship at Princeton he joined the faculty of the Bible Department at Hebrew University, where he served as the Chair of the Department from 1999-2001. Presently he is the Yehezkel Kaufmann Professor of Biblical studies at the Hebrew University of Jerusalem and a Senior Fellow at Shalom Hartman Institute in Jerusalem. He has served as a visiting professor at Berkeley, Stanford, Chicago Divinity School, and Harvard.

== Views and opinions ==
Knohl identifies as a religious Jew and claims that biblical criticism is not necessarily at odds with traditional Jewish beliefs. He points out that the view that the Pentateuch was composed by multiple authors is supported by a number of Jewish authors, beginning in the Bible itself, and culminating with Abraham ibn Ezra and Hasidei Ashkenaz.

== Published works ==
Knohl's first book, The Sanctuary of Silence, was originally published in Hebrew. Based on his doctoral dissertation, it relates to his theories about the dating of the Priestly source. Knohl proposes that the Priestly source (P) dates from a much earlier period than is usually assumed and that the Holiness code (H) represents an addition to the law code of P, rather than the standard interpretation which is the reverse. Knohl suggests that H might have been inserted into P as a response of the Temple priesthood to the growing prophetic movements. Knohl's view has been widely accepted by scholars, most notably by Jacob Milgrom in his influential commentary on Leviticus. The book won the Shkop Prize for the best work in biblical literature.

=== The Messiah Before Jesus: The Suffering Servant of the Dead Sea Scrolls ===
Knohl is best known for his theory that Jewish culture contained a myth about a messiah who rose from the dead in the days before Jesus of Nazareth. One of the historical antecedents of this messianic figure is Menahem the Essene who is mentioned several times in rabbinic literature. Those theories are expounded in The Messiah Before Jesus: The Suffering Servant of the Dead Sea Scrolls (University of California Press, 2000). He also finds evidence of this belief in the Dead Sea Scrolls, although his interpretation of the partially preserved Self-Glorification hymn upon which his theory relies is not universally accepted. In 2007, after researching the Gabriel Revelation inscription, Knohl claimed that it supported his contention of a murdered Messiah resurrected after three days, he based himself primarily on the words לשלושת ימין חאיה (after three days he will live) in the inscription. This reading was controversial and Knohl later recanted in favor of the more accepted לשלושת ימין האות (after three days there will be a sign). His ideas about the messiah-myth were reviewed extensively in the popular press, including the New York Times, and Time magazine.

=== Where are We From? ===
In Where are We From? Knohl presents his theory of Israelite beginnings. According to the subtitle the purpose of the book is to crack the genetic code of the Hebrew Bible, or more specifically to address questions regarding the genesis of the Jewish people, the root of its belief system, and how its laws and traditions originated.

Knohl bases himself on archaeological evidence and a critical reading of the biblical text. He claims that the Israelites became a nation in the 12th century BCE through the intertwining of three ethnically related groups, and that the Bible represents an integration of the beliefs of these groups.

The first group is the Hyksos, who were originally Canaanite slaves who then assimilated into the Egyptian population and ruled the country for 100 years beginning in 1638 BCE. This group was banished from Egypt in the 15th century BCE after the fall of their dynasty. It is from this group that the stories about Joseph’s greatness originated, as well as the idea of Israelite banishment from Egypt. One also finds abnormal descriptions of climate, such as the Nile turning into blood, in Egyptian sources such as the Ipuwer Papyrus. Other sources for our knowledge of the Hyksos, according to Knohl, include Jewish historian Josephus’ book Against Apion.

The myth of Abraham and his journey to Canaan originated, according to Knohl, with a group that immigrated from Mitanni following the fall of this kingdom at the hands of Shalmaneser I.

A third group were slaves that escaped from Egypt and they were responsible for perpetuating the myth of Israelite slavery in Egypt, the construction of the cities Pithom and Ramses, and the experience of running away from Egypt. According to Knohl, this third group the Apiru (related to the word Hebrew) escaped from Egypt in the year 1208 BCE during the reign of Pharaoh Merneptah, the son of Ramses II who built the city of Ramses. According to Knohl it was this group of escaped slaves that brought with them the idea of monotheism, which was conceived by Pharaoh Akhenaten. On their way to Canaan the Apiru passed through Midian and accepted Yahweh as the name of their God, as well as the tradition of not representing God through images or statues.

According to Knohl’s calculation the time that elapsed from the beginning of the Hyksos dynasty until the escape of the Apiru was exactly 430 years, which coincides with time of the Israelite sojourn in Egypt according to Exodus 12:41.

=== How the Bible was Born ===
In his 2018 book How the Bible was Born Knohl advanced a new theory about the Exodus, proposing an identification between Moses and Irsu. According to Papyrus Harris I and the Elephantine Stele, Irsu was a Shasu who took power in Egypt with the support of "Asiatics" (people from the Levant) after the death of Queen Twosret; after coming to power, Irsu and his supporters disrupted Egyptian rituals, "treating the gods like the people" and halting offerings to the Egyptian deities. They were eventually defeated and expelled by the new Pharaoh Setnakhte and, while fleeing, they abandoned large quantities of gold and silver they had stolen from the temples. It was originally thought that Irsu was Chancellor Bay, a prominent Asiatic officer who rose to power during the reign of Pharaoh Seti II and later attempted to usurped the throne; however, an IFAO Ostracon no. 1864 found at Deir el-Medina in 2000 states that Bay was executed during the reign of Pharaoh Siptah, well before Irsu's action, thus ruling out such identification.

According to Knohl, the Elephantine Stele and Papyrus Harris I may be the Egyptian propagandistic version of the Exodus story and Irsu may be Moses: in support of his theory, he notes that the Book of Exodus states that, while leaving, the Israelites had plundered the Egyptians, that the Israelites left Egypt in arms and that the Pharaoh was afraid of a possible alliance between the Israelites and Egypt's enemies. Knohl also notes that a similar version of the story can be found in Manetho's Aegyptiaca, which speaks of a leader named Osarseph who had overthrown the legitimate Pharaoh of Egypt leading a group of lepers and in alliance with the Hyksos, before being eventually expelled from Egypt and changing his name into Moses.

== Books ==
- The Conception of God and Cult in the Priestly Torah and in the Holiness School, (Doctoral Dissertation, 1988).
- The Sanctuary of Silence: The Priestly Torah and the Holiness School, (Jerusalem: Magnes Press, 1992. Hebrew. Minneapolis: Fortress Press, 1995. English).
- The Messiah Before Jesus: The Suffering Servant of the Dead Sea Scrolls, (Jerusalem: Schocken Press, 2000. Hebrew. Berkeley: University of California Press, 2000. English).
- The Divine Symphony: The Bible's Many Voices, (Philadelphia: Jewish Publication Society, 2003).
- Biblical Beliefs: The Borders of the Biblical Revolution, (Jerusalem: Magnes Press, 2007). Hebrew.
- Where Are We From?: The Genetic Code of the Bible, (Tel Aviv: Dvir Press, 2008). Hebrew.
- Messiahs and Resurrection in 'The Gabriel Revelation, (London: Continuum, 2009).
- Ha-Shem: The Secret Numbers of the Hebrew Bible and the Mystery of the Exodus from Egypt, (Tel Aviv: Dvir Press, 2012). Hebrew
- How the Bible was Born (Kinneret - Dvir, Modi'in, 2018). Hebrew.
- The Messiah Controversy: Who Are the Jews Waiting For? (מחלוקת המשיח), (Tel Aviv: Dvir Press, 2019). Hebrew.
- The Messiah Confrontation: Pharisees versus Sadducees and the Death of Jesus (Philadelphia: Jewish Publication Society, 2022).

== Articles ==
- 'The Acceptance of Sacrifices from Gentiles', Tarbiẕ, 48 (1979), pp. 341–345 (Heb.)
- 'A Parasha Concerned with Accepting the Kingdom of Heaven', Tarbiẕ, 53 (1983), pp. 11–32 (Heb.)
- 'The Priestly Torah Versus the Holiness School: Sabbath and the Festivals', HUCA, 58 (1987), pp. 65–118.
- ‘The Priestly Torah Versus the Holiness School: Ideological Aspects’, Proceedings of the Tenth World Congress of Jewish Studies, Jerusalem 1990, pp. 65–118.
- 'The Sin-Offering Law in the 'Holiness School', Tarbiẕ 59 (1990), pp. 1–10 (Heb.).
- 'Post-Biblical Sectarianism and Priestly Schools of the Pentateuch: The Issue of Popular Participation in the Temple Cult on Festivals', Tarbiẕ 60 (1991), 139-146 (Heb.).
- 'נגלות ונסתרות' - 'Uncovering and Concealment of Torah' JQR Supplement 1994 pp. 99–104.
- 'Biblical Attitudes to Gentiles Idolatry' Tarbiẕ, 64 (1995), pp. 5–12 (Heb.)
- 'Between Voice and Silence: The Relationship between Prayer and Temple Cult' Journal of Biblical Literature 115 (1996) pp. 17–30.
- ‘Re-Considering the Dating and recipient of Miqsat Ma’ase ha-Tora’, Hebrew Studies 37 (1996), pp. 119–125.
- ‘In the Face of Death’ in: A. Baumgarten (ed.), Self, Soul and Body in Religious Experience, Numen Sup. 78, Leiden 1998, pp. 87–95.
- ‘On “The Son of God”, Armillus and Messiah Son of Joseph’, Tarbiz, 68 (1998), 13-38.
- ‘The Guilt Offering of the Holiness School’, Vetus Testamentum, 54 (2004), pp. 516–526.
- 'Studies in the Gabriel Revelation', Tarbiẕ 76 (2007), 303-328
- "By Three days Live", Messiahs, Resurrection and Ascent to Heaven in Hazon Gabriel, The Journal of Religion 88 (2008), 147-158.
- 'Coupling of Holiness Concepts and Broadening of Holiness Circles in the Editorial Layer of the Torah', Tarbiz 78:4 (2009), 9 pp. (Heb.).
- 'Sacred Architecture: The Numerical Dimensions of Biblical Poems', VT 62 (2012), pp. 189–97.
- 'Psalm 68: Structure, Composition and Geography', Journal of Hebrew Scriptures; (2012), Vol. 12.
- 'The Original Version of Deborah's Song and its Numerical Structure', VT 66 (2016), pp. 45–65.
- 'From the Birth of the Bible to the Beginnings of Kabbala', Kabala 36 (2017), 193-226.
- 'Jacob-el in the Land of Esau and the Roots of Biblical Religion', VT 67 [2017] 481-484.

=== Co-authored articles ===
- Israel Knohl and S. Talmon, 'A Calendrical Scroll from a Qumran Cave: Mismarot Ba, 4Q431' in: D. Wright, D. N. Freedman and A. Hurvitz (eds.), Pomegranates and Golden Bells, Eisenbrauns, Winona Lake 1995, pp. 267–301.
- Israel Knohl, and S. Talmon 'A Calendrical Scroll from a Qumran Cave 4' in: M. V. Fox et al (eds.) Text, Temples, and Traditions, Eisenbrauns, Winona Lake 1996, pp. 65–71.
- Israel Knohl and S. Naeh, 'Studies in the Priestly Torah: Lev. 7:19-21', in: S. Japhet (ed.), The Bible in the Light of its Interpreters, Jerusalem 1994, pp. 601–612.
- Israel Knohl and S. Naeh, 'Milluim Ve-Kippurim', Tarbiẕ, 62 (1992) 17-44 ( Heb.).

=== Anthologies ===
- ' From Fear to Love', in: L. Mazor (ed.), Job in the Bible, Thought and Art, Jerusalem 1995, pp. 89–103 (Heb.).
- ‘Human Freedom in the Bible’ in: Human Dignity and Freedom in the Jewish Heritage, Proceedings of the President’s Study Group on the Bible and Sources of Judaism, Jerusalem 1995, pp. 60–70 (Heb.).
- ‘Two Aspects of the “Tent of Meeting"', in: M. Cogan, B. Eichler and J. H. Tigay (eds.) Tehillah le-Moshe, Eisenbrauns, Winona Lake 1997, pp. 73–79.
- ‘Cain – The Forefather of Humanity’, in: C. Cohen et al (eds.), Sefer Moshe, The Moshe Weinfeld Jubilee Volume, Eisenbrauns, Winona Lake, Indiana 2004, 63-68.
- ‘Religion and Politics in Psalm, in S. M. Paul et al (eds.), Emanuel, Studies in Hebrew Bible, Septuagint and Dead Sea Scrolls in Honor of Emanuel Tov, Leiden 2003, pp. 725-727.
- ‘Sin, Pollution and Purity: Israel', in S. I. Johnston (ed.), Religions of the Ancient World: A Guide, Harvard University Press, Cambridge MA 2004, 502-504.
- ‘New Light on the Copper Scroll and 4QMMT’, in: G. J. Brooke and P. R. Davis (eds.), Copper Scroll Studies, Journal for the Study of the Pseudepigrapha Supplement Series 40, Sheffield 2002, pp. 233–257.
- ‘Axial Transformations within Ancient Israelite Priesthood’ in: J. P. Arnason, S.N. Eisenstadt, and B. Wittrock (eds.), Axial Civilizations and World History, Brill, Leiden 2004, pp. 199–222.
- ‘Cain: Son of God or Son of Satan’, in: N. B. Dohrmann and D. Stern (eds.), Jewish Biblical Interpretation in a Comparative Context, The University of Pennsylvania Press, Philadelphia, 2008, 37-50.
- ‘Nimrod Son of Cush, King of Mesopotamia, and the Dates of P and J’, in: V. A. Hurowitz (ed.) Birkat Shalom, S. Paul Jubilee Volume . Eisenbrauns, Winona Lake, Indiana, 2008, 45-52.
- "The Figure of Melchizedek in the Hebrew Bible, the Dead Sea Scrolls and the New Testament’ in : R. A. Clements and D. R. Schwartz (eds.), Text, Thought and Practice in Qumran and Early Christianity – Proceedings of the Ninth International Orion Symposium, Brill, Leiden 2009, 255-266.
- 'The Bible Reworked at Qumran: The Temple Scroll and 4QReworked Pentateuch', in: M. Kister (ed.) The Qumran Scrolls and their World, Vol. 1, Yad Ben-zvi Press, Jerusalem 2009, 143-156 (Heb.).
- God's Victory over ‘The Olden Gods’: Theological Corrections in Deuteronomy 33.12, 27, in: A. Brenner and F. H. Polak (eds.), Words, Ideas, Worlds, Biblical Essays in Honour of Yairah Amit, Sheffield 2012, 145-149.
- 'A Hurrian Myth in a late Jewish Text: Sepher Zerubavel', in: G. Bohak, R. Margolin and I. Rosen – Zvi, (eds.), Myth, Ritual and Mysticism, Tel Aviv 2014, 73-84 [Heb.].
- 'P and the Traditions of Northern Syria and Southern Anatolia' in: F. Landy, L. Trevaskis & B. Bibb (eds.) Text, Time, and Temple edited, Sheffield 2015, 63-69.
