= Osarseph =

Legendary figure of Ancient Egypt who has been equated with Moses

Osarseph /ˈoʊzərˌsɛf/ or Osarsiph /ˈoʊzərˌsɪf/ (Koine Greek: Ὀσαρσίφ) is a legendary figure of Ancient Egypt who has been equated with Moses. According to Josephus, the 1st century CE Jewish historian, the story of Osarseph was recounted by the Ptolemaic Egyptian priest Manetho in his Aegyptiaca (first half of the 3rd century BC). Manetho's work is lost, but Josephus relates extensively from what he maintains are epitomes of the original.

According to Josephus’s quotation of Manetho in Against Apion (I.26–31), Osarseph was an Ancient Egyptian priest from Heliopolis who led a revolt of people described as lepers and “unclean” against a pharaoh named Amenophis (the Greek form of Amenhotep, referring either to Amenhotep II or Amenhotep IV). The rebels allied themselves with the expelled Hyksos, who, according to Josephus, returned from the region later associated with Jerusalem in his narrative, to join them in despoiling Egypt, before being expelled once more when Amenophis regained power. Toward the end of the story, Osarseph is said to have changed his name to Moses.

Later chronographers such as Africanus and Eusebius, attempting to align Manetho's narrative with known Egyptian dynasties, identified this Amenophis as a king “between two Ramesses”, sometimes calling him "Seti" and the “son of Ramses”.

These identifications are not supported by Egyptian chronology: the Hyksos (c. 1650–1550 BCE), the Amenhotep kings (c. 1525–1350 BCE), and the Ramessides (c. 1290–1070 BCE) belong to distinct, non-overlapping periods. Modern Egyptology therefore treats Manetho's narrative as a composite legend rather than a literal historical record.

Some later interpretations of Josephus's account suggest that the Hyksos established settlements in the Levant, including the city later called Jerusalem, though this is considered legendary and not supported by archaeology.

Much debated is the question of what, if any, historical reality might lie behind the Osarseph story. An influential study by Egyptologist Jan Assmann has suggested that no single historical incident or person lies behind the legend, and that it represents instead a conflation of several historical traumas, notably the religious reforms of Akhenaten (Amenhotep IV).

== Story ==
The story of Osarseph is known from two long quotations from the Aegyptiaca, a history of Egypt by the Egyptian historian Manetho, in Josephus's Against Apion. The first is Manetho's account of the expulsion of the Hyksos (the name is given by Manetho) and their settlement in Judea, where they founded the city of Jerusalem. Josephus then draws the conclusion that Manetho's Hyksos were the Israelites of the Exodus, although Manetho himself makes no such connection.

The second story is of Osarseph, set some two hundred years later. According to Josephus, Manetho described Osarseph as a tyrannical Egyptian high priest of Osiris at Heliopolis. Pharaoh Amenophis had a desire to see the gods, but in order to do so he first had to cleanse Egypt of lepers and other polluted people, setting 80,000 of them to work in the stone quarries, and then confining them to Avaris, the former Hyksos capital in the Eastern Delta. There, Osarseph became their leader and ordered them to abandon worship of the gods and eat the meat of the holy animals. The Osarsephites then invited the Hyksos back into Egypt, and together with their new allies drove Amenophis and his son Ramses into exile in Nubia and instituted a 13-year reign of religious oppression: towns and temples were devastated, the images of the gods destroyed, and sanctuaries turned into kitchens where sacred animals were roasted over fires. Eventually, Amenophis and Rameses returned to expel the lepers and the Hyksos, and restore the old Egyptian religion. Towards the end of the story, Manetho reports Osarseph took the name "Moses".

== Interpretations ==
Three interpretations have been proposed for the story: the first, as a memory of the Amarna period; the second, as a memory of the Hyksos; and the third, as anti-Jewish propaganda. Each explanation has evidence to support it: the name of the pharaoh, Amenophis, and the religious character of the conflict fit the Amarna reform of Egyptian religion; the name of Avaris and possibly the name Osarseph fit the Hyksos period, and the overall plot is an apparent inversion of the Jewish story of the Exodus which now casts the Israelites in a bad light. No one theory, however, can explain all the elements. An influential proposition by Egyptologist Jan Assmann suggests that the story has no single origin but rather combines numerous historical experiences, notably the Amarna and Hyksos periods, into a folk memory.

An alternative theory identifies Osarseph with the historical figure of Chancellor Bay, a prominent Syrian officer who rose to power during the reign of Pharaoh Seti II and later attempted to usurp the throne, only to be arrested and executed by order of Pharaoh Siptah. However, such identification is usually rejected by scholars.

Israel Knohl recently proposed to identify Osarseph with Irsu, a Shasu who, according to Papyrus Harris I and the Elephantine Stele, took power in Egypt with the support of "Asiatics" (people from the Levant) after the death of Queen Twosret; after coming to power, Irsu and his supporters disrupted Egyptian rituals, "treat[ed] the gods like the people" and refused to make offerings to the Egyptian deities. Irsu and his supporters were eventually defeated and expelled by the new Pharaoh Setnakhte and, as they fled, abandoned large quantities of gold and silver which they had stolen from the temples.

It is possible that the Osarseph story is an alteration to Manetho's original history made in the 1st century BC when anti-Jewish sentiment was running high in Egypt, since without this Manetho's history has no mention of the Jews at all. If the story is an original part of Manetho's history of Egypt, the question arises of where he could have heard it, as the Greek Septuagint translation of the Hebrew Torah (i.e., the Exodus narrative) had not been made when he was writing. It is possible that he had an oral (Jewish) informant, or possibly an otherwise unknown pre-Septuagint translation. In accordance with this, Manetho, indeed, stated that Amenophis was the son of Ramses and the father of Ramses, whose original name was Sethos (Seti).

== See also ==
- Amenmesse
- Hyksos
- Joseph and His Brothers
- Moses and Monotheism by Sigmund Freud
- Religious war
