= Irsu =

Ancient Egyptian ruler

Irsu in hieroglyphs
D4 r M23 Z7 T14 A1
Jr-sw (contested)
"He who made himself"
M23 Z7 T14 A1
Sw
Proper name
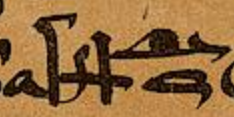
- "Irsu" written in hieratic on the Papyrus Harris

Irsu (Ancient Egyptian: jr-sw, "he who made himself"; alternatively Su) is the name used in Papyrus Harris I to designate a Shasu who became overlord of a group of local rulers nominally under Egyptian control, at a time of unrest between the Nineteenth and Twentieth Dynasties. The reading of the name is contested and the man may instead have simply been called Su. The events in which Irsu (or Su) participated likely took place outside of the Nile Valley, in the Asiatic territories of Egypt's empire.

== Debate on Irsu's activities ==
=== In Egypt ===
Irsu's rise to power is closely related to the situation in Egypt proper at the end of the Nineteenth Dynasty, which saw a civil war between Amenmesse and Seti II followed by economic decline. Modern understanding of the events occurring at the time is heavily dependent on the translation of Papyrus Harris I, a task which has proven difficult. In his 1906 translation of the document James Henry Breasted writes

Hear ye that I may inform you of my benefactions which I did while I was king of the people. The land of Egypt was overthrown from without, and every man was (thrown out) of his right; they had no chief mouth for many years formerly until other times. The land of Egypt was in the hands of chiefs and of rulers of towns; one slew his neighbor, great and small. Other times having come after it, with empty years, Yarsu, a certain Syrian was with them as chief. He set the whole land tributary before him together; he united his companions and plundered their possessions. They made the gods like men, and no offerings were presented in the temples.

This translation leaves open the possibility that Irsu acted in Egypt proper and consequently Chancellor Bay was considered a plausible candidate for this Irsu until 2000. However, an IFAO Ostracon no. 1864 found at Deir el-Medina and dated Siptah's fifth regnal year records that "Pharaoh, life health prosperity, has killed the great enemy, Bay". Because chancellor Bay died years before Irsu, he is no longer considered a plausible candidate for this historical figure.

=== In Egyptian territories in Canaan ===
In 1979 the Egyptologist Hans Goedicke produced a second translation based on a detailed grammatical analysis of the document:

The land belonging to Egypt was abandoned abroad and every man in his loyalty, he did not have a chief-spokesman [i.e. a pharaoh] for many years first until the times of others when the land belonging to Egypt was among chiefs and city-rulers — one was killed [the pharaoh], his replacement was a dignitary of wretches [a second pharaoh]. Another of the family happened after him in the empty years [a third pharaoh], when Su, a Kharu with them, acted as chief and he made the entire land serviceable to him alone. He joined his dependant in seizing their property, when the gods were treated just like men, as one did not perform offerings inside the temples.

Goedicke suggests that Irsu rose to power in Egypt's territories abroad, in Canaan, following years of neglect on behalf of the last three pharaohs of the Nineteenth Dynasty, Seti II, Siptah and Twosret--specifically Goedicke suggests that Irsu's power base was in the domain later known as ancient Israel. At this time the whole of Syro-Palestine is referred to in Egypt as Khor, and the people living there were known as Kharru: Thus he calls Irsu, "Irsu, the Kharru." According to this translation of the document, the earliest of these pharaohs, Seti II, is responsible for not asserting his power and control over the region; the second was held in low regard; while the last, Twosret, is said to have made an alliance with Irsu who had de facto authority over the territories.

Goedicke's interpretations have been disputed. Egyptologists Aidan Dodson and Frederic Servajean argue that P. Harris (and contemporary records of Setnakhte) describe events within Egypt itself, rather than the Syro-Canaanite lands.

== The end of Irsu ==
What happened to Irsu is made clear on the papyrus, which tells of Setnakht's rise and the end of the rebellion:

But when the gods inclined themselves to peace, to set the land (in) its right according to its accustomed manner, they established their son, who came forth from their limbs, to be Ruler, L. P. H., of every land, upon their great throne, (even) Userkhare-Setepnere-Meriamon, L. P. H., Son of Re, Setnakht-Mererre-Meriamon, L. P. H. He was Khepri-Set, when he is enraged; he set in order the entire land which had been rebellious; he slew the rebels who were in the land of Egypt; he cleansed the great throne of Egypt; he was Ruler, L. P. H., of the Two Lands, on the throne of Atum. He gave ready faces, which had been turned away. Every man knew his brother who had been walled in. He established the temples in possession of divine offerings, to offer.

Twosret's successor Setnakhte's Elephantine stele records how he expelled these Asiatic rebels who, on their flight from Egypt, abandoned much of the gold, silver and copper which they had stolen from Egypt, and with which they had intended to hire reinforcements among the Asiatics. His pacification of Egypt is also referred to in the Great Harris Papyrus.

Setnakht's Elephantine stele describes it further: His Majesty, life, prosperity, health, was like his father Seth who stretched out his arms in order to remove from Egypt those who led it astray, his strength surrounding (him) with protection."

== Memory ==
Papyrus Harris I portrays his tenure in office as a time when Egypt was in chaos and temple offerings were denied to the gods. After the death of Twosret, Egypt seems to have fallen into anarchy, with many temples being looted by Asiatic followers of Irsu.

Twosret's successor Setnakhte's Elephantine stele records how he expelled these Asiatic rebels who, on their flight from Egypt, abandoned much of the gold, silver and copper which they had stolen from Egypt, and with which they had intended to hire reinforcements among the Asiatics.

It is possible that memories of these events were distortedly reported in the third century BCE by the Hellenistic Egyptian historian and priest Manetho, who claimed that a certain Egyptian priest from Heliopolis called Osarseph led leprous Asiatics out of Egypt, in an Exodus later reportedly that of Moses.

C. Hauret suggests that Irsu's career also has a resemblance to that of the Biblical Joseph. Thomas Römer writes that some think that "Osarseph is a polemical name for Akhenaton; others think of a combination of Joseph and Osiris."
