= Joseph and His Brothers =

Tetralogy by Thomas Mann

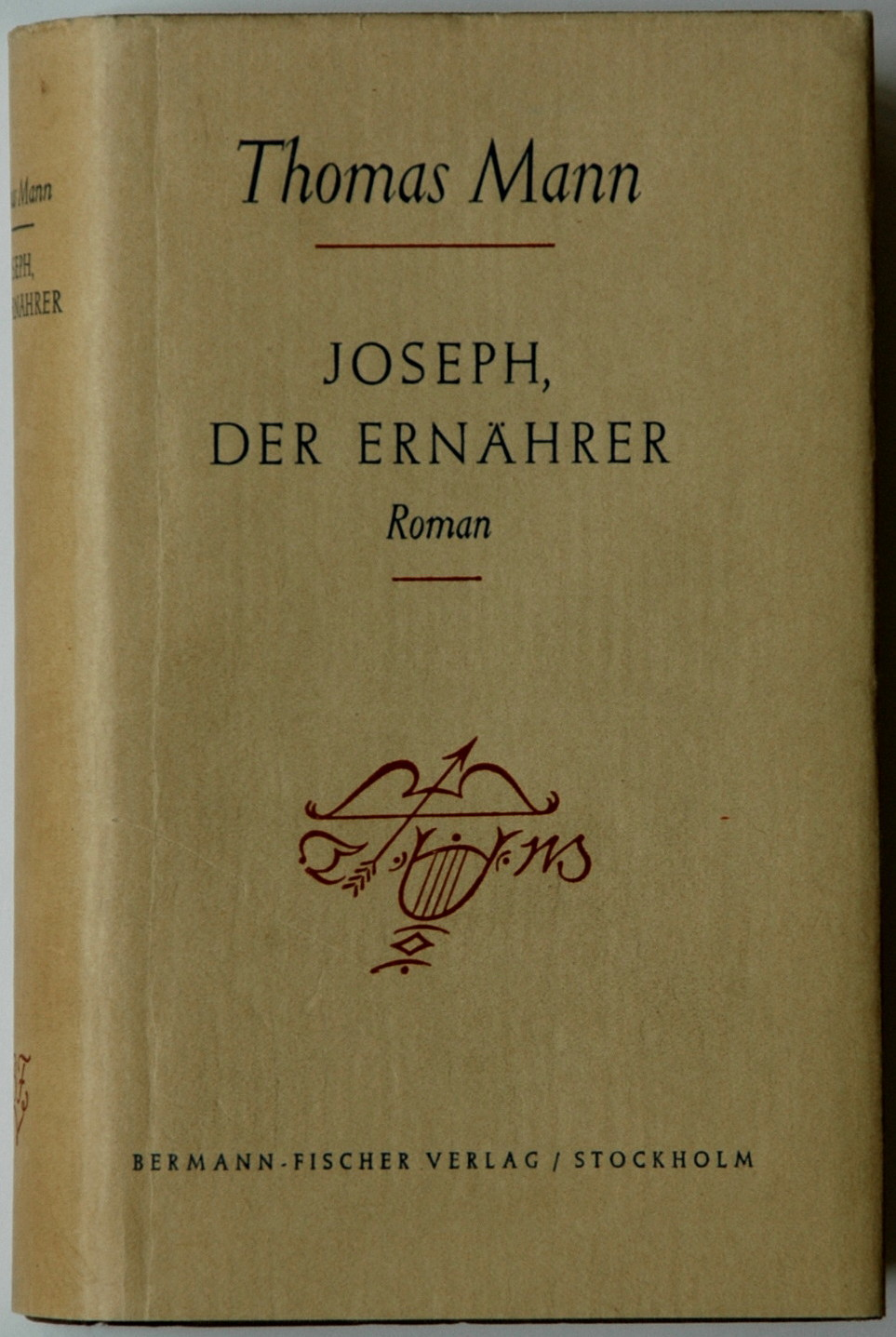
- Cover of the first edition of part 4 (1943)
- Author: Thomas Mann
- Original title: Joseph und seine Brüder
- Language: German
- Publication date: 1933–1943
- Publication place: Germany
- Media type: Print

Joseph and His Brothers (German: Joseph und seine Brüder, pronounced [ˈjoːzɛf ʊnt ˌzaɪ̯nə ˈbʁyːdɐ]) is a four-part novel by Thomas Mann, written over the course of 16 years. Mann retells the familiar stories of Genesis, from Jacob to Joseph (chapters 27–50), setting it in the historical context of the Amarna Period. Mann considered it his greatest work.

The tetralogy consists of:

- The Stories of Jacob (Die Geschichten Jaakobs; written December 1926 to October 1930, Genesis 27–36)
- Young Joseph (Der junge Joseph; written January 1931 to June 1932, Genesis 37)
- Joseph in Egypt (Joseph in Ägypten; written July 1932 to 23 August 1936, Genesis 38–39)
- Joseph the Provider (Joseph, der Ernährer; written 10 August 1940 to 4 January 1943, Genesis 40–50)

== Themes ==
Mann's presentation of the ancient Orient and the origins of Judaism is influenced by Alfred Jeremias' 1904 Das Alte Testament im Lichte des Alten Orients, which emphasized Babylonian influence in the development of Genesis, and by the work of Dmitry Merezhkovsky.

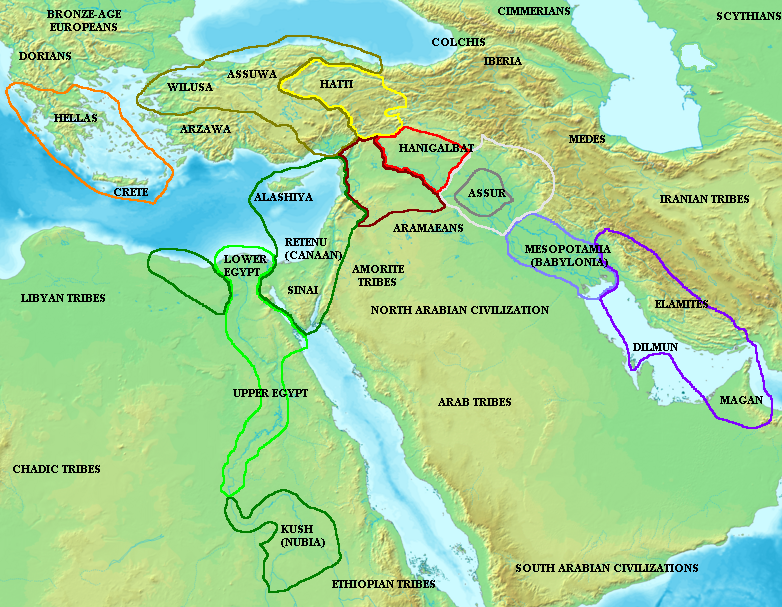
Map of the ancient Near East during the Amarna Period, showing the great powers of the period: Egypt (green), Hatti (yellow), the Kassite kingdom of Babylon (purple), Assyria (grey), and Mittani (red). Lighter areas show direct control, darker areas represent spheres of influence. The extent of the Achaean/Mycenaean civilization is shown in orange.

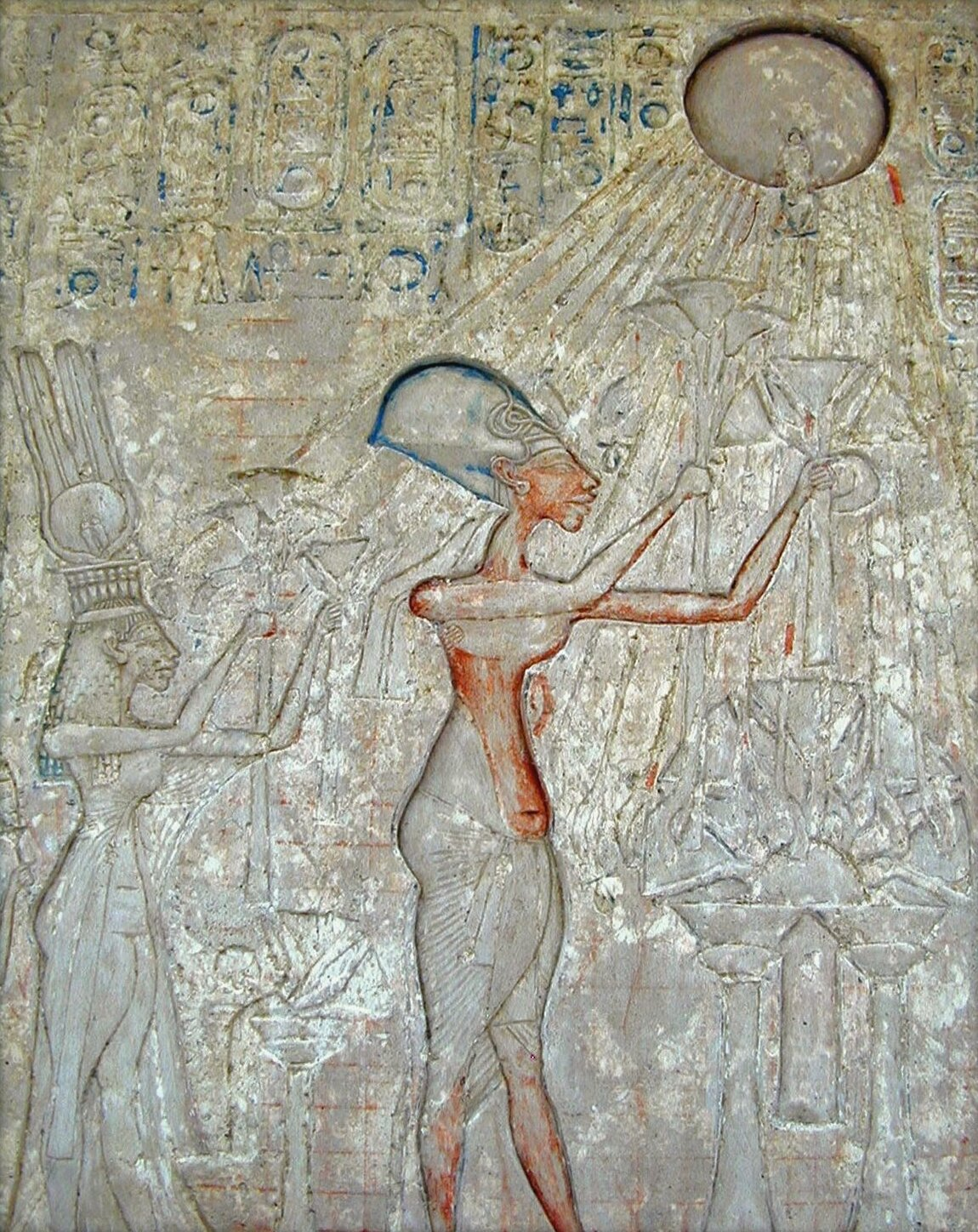
Pharaoh Akhenaten and his family adoring Aten.

Mann sets the story in the 14th century BC and makes Akhenaten the pharaoh who appoints Joseph his vice-regent. Joseph is aged 28 at the ascension of Akhenaten, which would mean he was born about 1380 BC in standard Egyptian chronology, and Jacob in the mid-1420s BC. Other contemporary rulers mentioned include Tushratta and Suppiluliuma.

A dominant topic of the novel is Mann's exploration of the status of mythology and his presentation of the Late Bronze Age mindset with regard to mythical truths and the emergence of monotheism. Events of the story of Genesis are frequently associated and identified with other mythic topics.

Central is the notion of underworld and the mythical descent to the underworld. Jacob's sojourn in Mesopotamia (hiding from the wrath of Esau) is paralleled with Joseph's life in Egypt (exiled by the jealousy of his brothers), and on a smaller scale his captivity in the well; they are further identified with the "hellraid" of Inanna-Ishtar-Demeter, the Mesopotamian Tammuz myth, the Jewish Babylonian captivity as well as the Harrowing of Hell of Jesus Christ.

Abraham is repeatedly presented as the man who "discovered God" (a Hanif, or discoverer of monotheism). Jacob as Abraham's heir is charged with further elaborating this discovery. Joseph is surprised to find Akhenaten on the same path (although Akhenaten is not the "right person" for the path), and Joseph's success with the pharaoh is largely due to the latter's sympathy for "Abrahamic" theology. Such a connection of (proto-)Judaism and Atenism had been suggested before Mann, most notably by Sigmund Freud in his Moses and Monotheism, which had appeared in 1939, just before Mann began work on the tetralogy's fourth part—although in the last installment of Mann's work, Akhenaten is postulated as the Pharaoh of the Exodus contemporary of Moses, while Mann in his novella "Das Gesetz" (1944) casts Ramesses II in that role.

As Joseph is saved from the well and sold to Egypt, he adopts a new name, Osarseph, replacing the Yo- element with a reference to Osiris to indicate that he is now in the underworld. This change of name to account for changing circumstances encourages Amenhotep to change his own name to Akhenaten.

The tetralogy closes with a detailed account of Jacob's famous Blessing of his sons and their tribes, his death and the funeral. The characters of the individual brothers are determined by epithets taken from the text of the Blessing of Jacob throughout the details; thus Reuben is "turbulent as the waters" (and associated with Aquarius by Jacob). Simeon and Levi are known as the "twins" (and associated with Gemini), even though they are a year apart, and portrayed as violent bullies. Juda is a lion (Leo), and inherits Abraham's blessing since Jacob disrobes his elder brothers of their birthright. Zebulun shows predilection for Phoenicians and seafaring. Jacob calls "bony" Issachar a donkey to evoke Asellus, γ and δ of Cancer. Dan is sharp-witted and "suited as a judge" (Libra). Asher is fond of dainties. Joseph is blessed by Jacob in his dual aspect of male (Dumuzi, god of seed and harvest), with reference to Taurus, and female (since for Jacob, his beloved Rachel lives on in Joseph, and in his affinity with the nourishing Earth), with reference to Virgo. As Jacob comes to Benjamin, his strength is almost gone, and with his last breath he rather incoherently compares his youngest son with a wolf, partly because of Lupus in Scorpio.

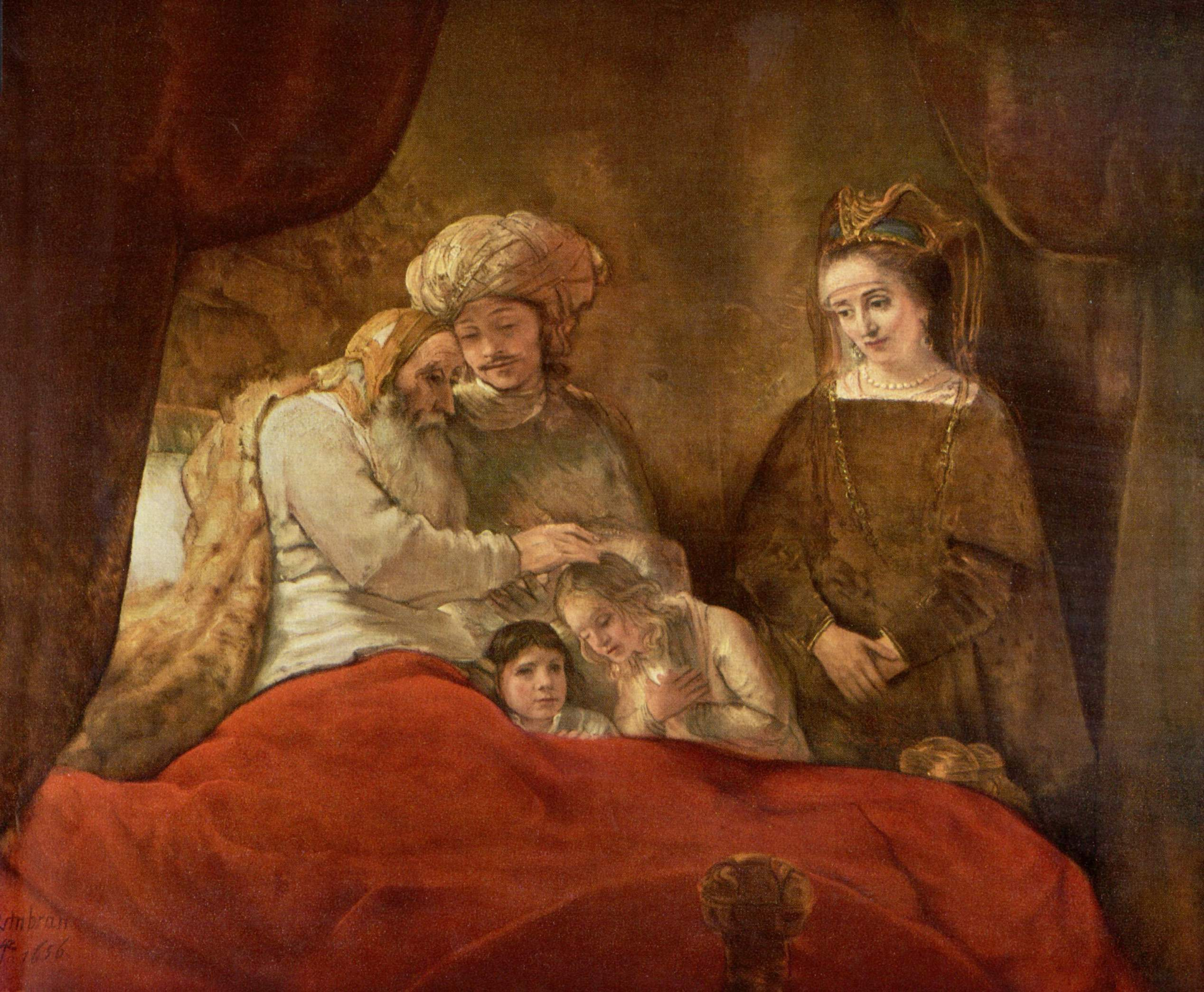
Jacob blessing Joseph's second son first. Rembrandt, 1656

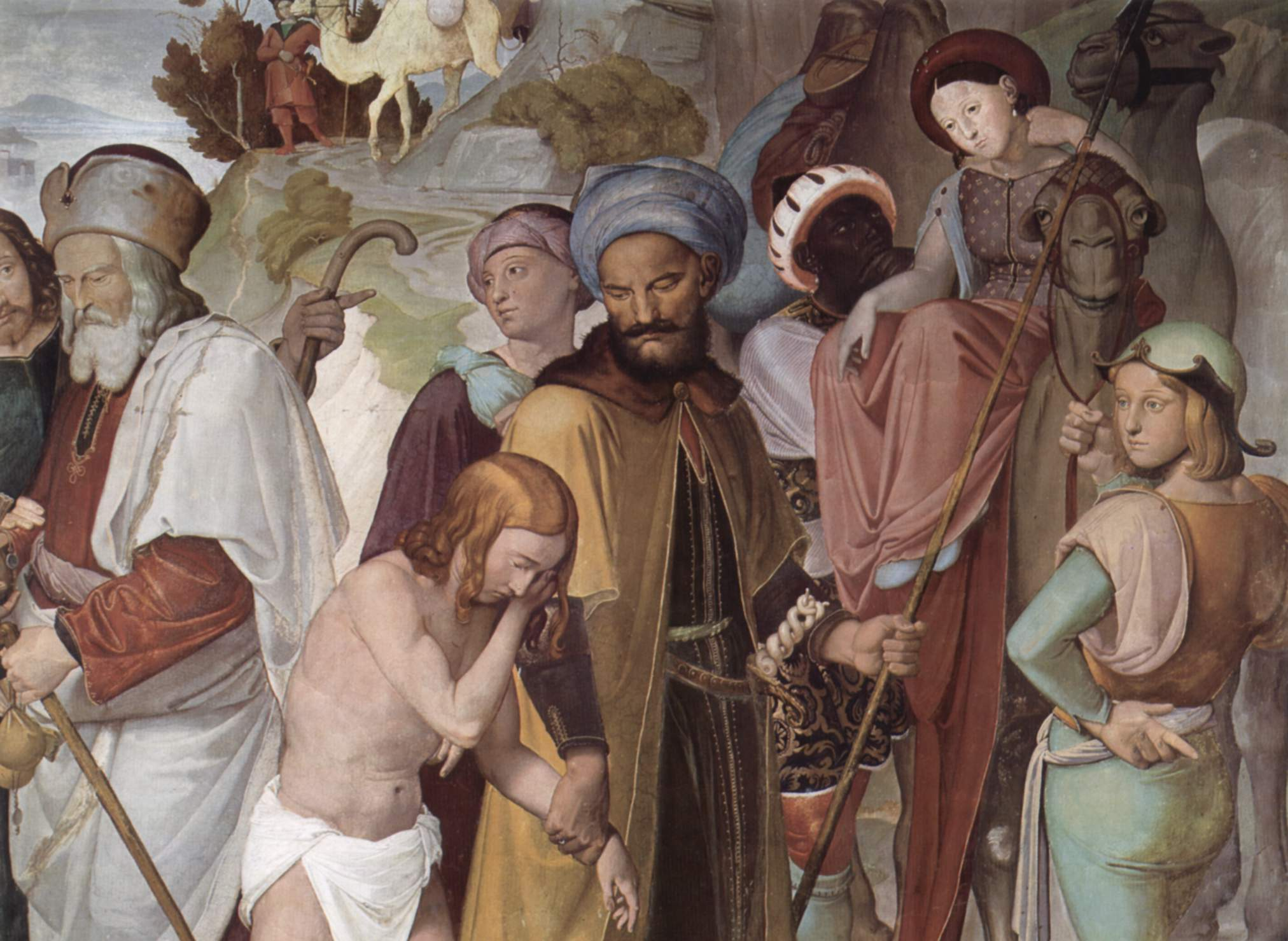
F. Overbeck, 1816/17: Joseph is sold by his brothers.

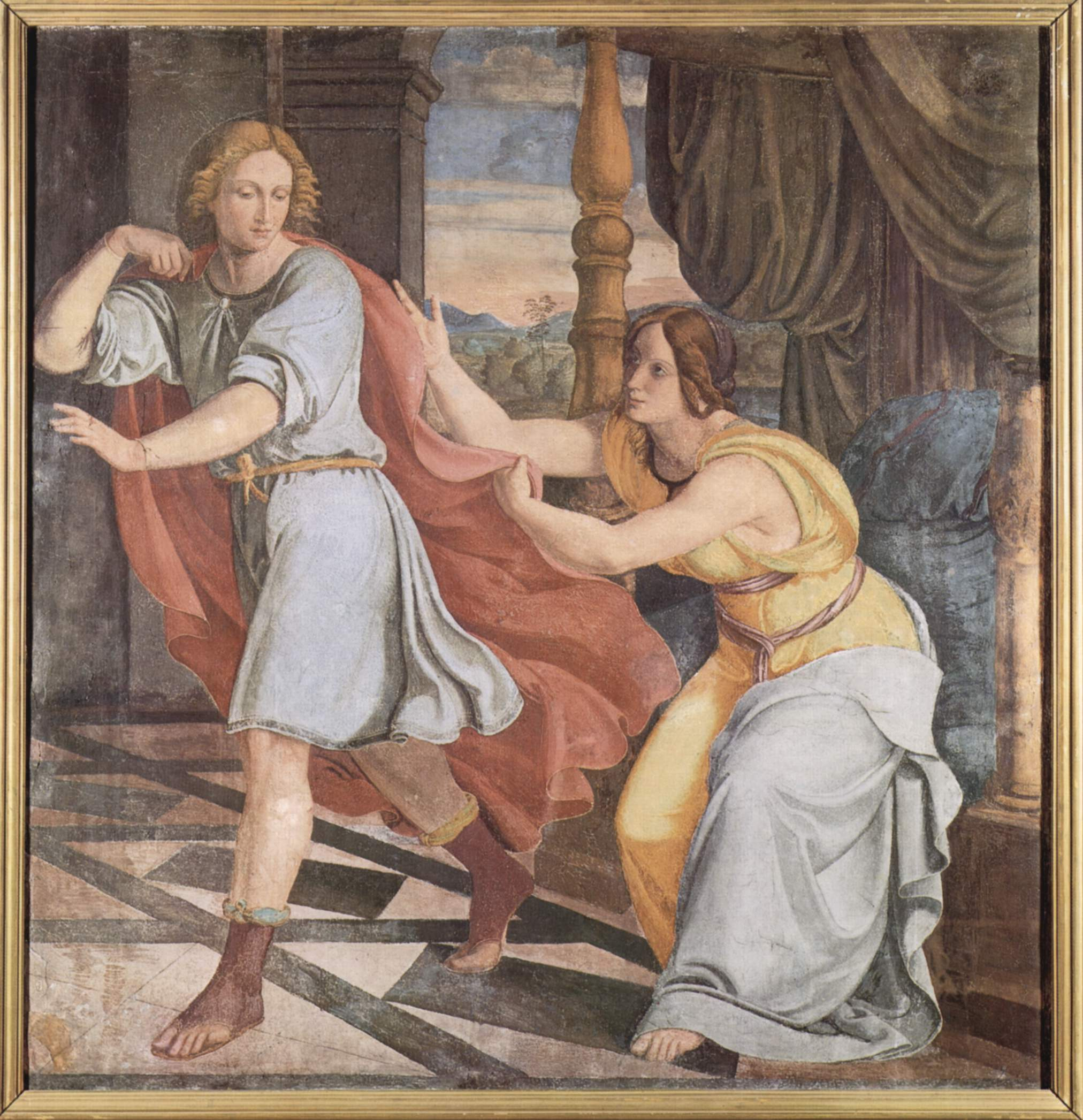
Philipp Veit, 1816/17: Joseph fleeing from Potiphar's wife.

== Chapter structure ==
Each one of the four books is divided into seven chapters, each of which is divided into further subdivisions. The first and last book also comprise a “Prelude” each.

=== The Tales of Jacob ===
- Prelude. Descent into Hell
- I. By the Well
- II. Jacob and Esau
- III. The story of Dinah
- IV. The flight
- V. Serving Laban
- VI. The Sisters
- VII. Rachel

=== Young Joseph ===
- I. Thoth
- II. Abraham
- III. Joseph and Benjamin
- IV. The Dreamer
- V. The Journey to the Brothers
- VI. The Stone Before the Grave
- VII. He Who Was Mangled

=== Joseph in Egypt ===
- I. The Journey Downwards
- II. The Entrance into Sheol
- III. The Arrival
- IV. The Highest
- V. The Man of the Blessing
- VI. The Smitten One
- VII. The Pit

=== Joseph the Provider ===
- Prelude in the Upper Circles
- I. The Second Pit
- II. The Summons
- III. The Cretan Loggia
- IV. The Time of Enfranchisement
- V. Tamar
- VI. The God-Story
- VII. The Lost Is Found

== Editions and translations ==
- Die Geschichten Jaakobs. S. Fischer Verlag, Frankfurt am Main. ISBN 3-596-29435-5
- Der junge Joseph. S. Fischer Verlag, Frankfurt am Main. ISBN 3-10-048230-1
- Joseph in Ägypten. S. Fischer Verlag, Frankfurt am Main. ISBN 3-10-048232-8
- Joseph der Ernährer. S. Fischer Verlag, Frankfurt am Main. ISBN 3-10-048233-6
- Hungarian translation by György Sárközy. Budapest: Athenaeum, 1946. ISBN 978-963-689984-4
- Finnish translation by Lauri Hirvensalo. Helsinki/Porvoo: WSOY, 1947.
- English translation by H. T. Lowe-Porter. New York: Alfred A. Knopf, 1948. ISBN 0-394-43132-4.
- Hebrew translation by Mordechai Avi Shaul. Merhavia, Israel: Hakibbutz Haartzi Hashomer Hatzair. 4 Vol, 1957-1959.
- Spanish translation by Jose Maria Souviron and Hernán del Solar. Santiago de Chile: Editorial Ercilla. 2 Vol, 1962.
- Russian translation by Solomon Apt. Leningrad: Khudozhestvennaya Literatura. 2 Vol, 1968.
- English translation by John E. Woods. New York: Alfred A. Knopf, 2005. ISBN 1-4000-4001-9.
- Dutch translation by Thijs Pollmann. Uitgeverij Wereldbibliotheek, Amsterdam, 2014. ISBN 9789028424005.

== See also ==
- Osarseph
- Moses and Monotheism
- Akhenaten
- Meritaten
