= Tiy-Merenese =

- Queen consort of Egypt
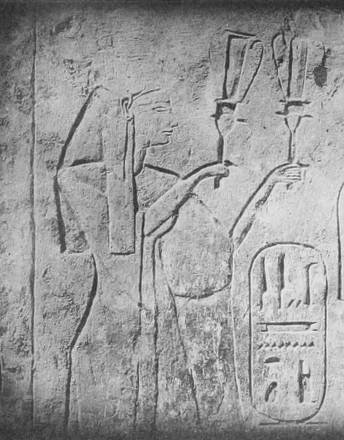
- Tiy-Merenese on a block found in Abydos (JE 36339).
- Spouse: Pharaoh Sethnakht
- Issue: Ramesses III
- Dynasty: 20th Dynasty
- Religion: Ancient Egyptian religion

< ti Z4 i i N36 n Q1 t H8 >
Tiy-merenese
in hieroglyphs
Era: New Kingdom
(1550–1069 BC)

Tiy-Merenese, Teye-Merenaset, Tiye-Mereniset (Tiy, Beloved of Isis) was the Great Royal Wife of pharaoh Setnakhte and mother of Ramesses III of the Twentieth Dynasty of Egypt.

She is the only known wife of Setnakhte. She was depicted together with her husband on a stela in Abydos. A priest named Meresyotef is shown adoring Setnakhte and Tiy-Merenese and their son Ramesses III is shown making offerings. Tiye-Merenese also appears on blocks found in Abydos which were reused in other buildings.
