= Setnakhte =

First pharaoh of the 20th dynasty

- Setnakht
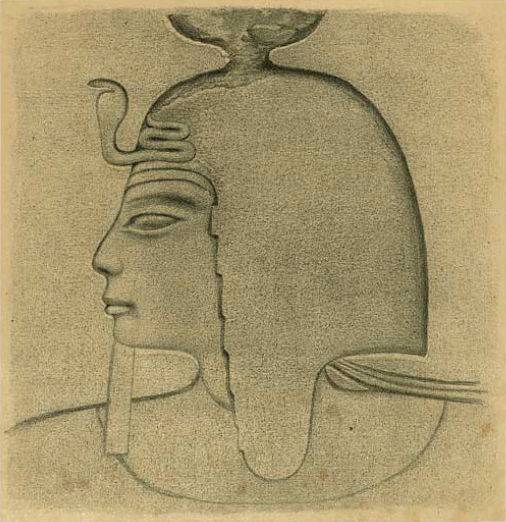
- Drawing of a relief of pharaoh Sethnakht.

Pharaoh
- Reign: 1188–1185 BC
- Predecessor: Twosret
- Successor: Ramesses III
Royal titulary
Horus name
Kanakht Werpehti
G5	E1 D40 G36 r F9 F9 t Z4
Nebty name
Tutkhaumitatjenen
G16	t G43 t A53 N28 D36 Z2 W19
Golden Horus
Sekhemkhepeshder(kher)uef
Prenomen
Userkhaure-setepenre
Powerful are the forms of Re, Chosen of Re

M23 X1 L2 X1	N5 wsr N28 Z2 N5 U21 n
Nomen
Setnakht Meryamunra
Seth Is Victorious; Beloved Of Amon-Re

G39 N5	N5 C12 C7 D40 N36 r&r
- Consort: Tiy-Merenese
- Children: Ramesses III
- Died: 1186 BC
- Burial: KV14
- Dynasty: Twentieth Dynasty

Userkhaure-setepenre Setnakhte (also called Setnakht or Sethnakht) was the first pharaoh (1188 BC–1185 BC) of the Twentieth Dynasty of the New Kingdom of Egypt and the father of Ramesses III.

== Accession ==
Setnakhte was not the son, brother or a direct descendant of either Twosret or Merneptah Siptah—the immediately preceding two pharaohs—nor that of Siptah's predecessor Seti II, whom Ramesses III, Setnakhte's son, formally considered the last legitimate ruler in his Medinet Habu kinglist. Setnakhte was a man of unknown origins who seized the throne during a time of crisis and political unrest likely from Twosret and he was presumably a minor descendant of Ramesses II through a separate family line from that of Seti II, Siptah and Twosret. As Aidan Dodson writes, Setnakhte's accession to power as an usurper is confirmed by a victory stela at Elephantine at Aswan, which shows his rise to power was accompanied by violence and a civil war:

The great assembly of the gods is pleased with his plans like Re, since the land had been in confusion....[The great god] stretched out his arm and selected his person, l.p.h., from among the millions, dismissing the hundreds of thousands prior to him....Now his person, l.p.h., was like his father Sutekh, who flexed his arms to rid Egypt of those who had led it astray....Fear of him has seized the hearts of opponents before him: they flee like [flocks] of sparrows with a falcon after them. They left silver and gold....which they had given to these Asiatics in order for them to bring reinforcements....Their plans failed and the plans were futile, as every god and goddess performed wonders for the good god, proclaiming the [onse]t of a slaughter under him....On Year 2, II Shemu 10 [of king Setnakhte] there were no (more) opponents of his person, l.p.h., in any lands. They came to inform his person, l.p.h.: 'Let your heart be happy, O lord of this land; those things that the god foretold have come to pass and your foes do not exist in the land...."

Setnakhte's opponents are depicted to be desperate enough to hire supporters from Syria and Canaan, in this stela.

Senakhte married Tiy-Merenese, who was perhaps a daughter of Merneptah. A connection between Setnakhte's successors and the preceding Nineteenth Dynasty is also suggested by one of Ramesses II's children bearing this name and that similar names are shared by Setnakhte's descendants, such as Ramesses, Amun-her-khepshef, Seth-her-khepshef and Monthu-her-khepshef.

== Reign length ==
Setnakhte was originally believed to have enjoyed a reign of only two years based upon his Year 2 Elephantine stela but his third regnal year is reportedly attested in Inscription No. 271 on Mount Sinai. although the reading of the Year 3 inscription has been called into question "as only two strokes appear after “rnpt Hsbt,“ before damage obscures what could be another stroke." If his theoretical accession date is assumed to be II Shemu 10, based on the date of his Elephantine stela, Setnakhte would have ruled Egypt for at least two years and 11 months before he died, or nearly three full years. This date is 1 day removed from Twosret's highest known date of Year 8, II Shemu 9 (although Twosret is known to have ruled for a minimum of 6 more months at her mortuary temple at Gournah), and is based upon a calculation of Ramesses III's known accession date of I Shemu 26. Peter Clayton also assigned Setnakhte a reign of three years in his 1994 book on the Egyptian pharaohs.

Year 4 quartzite stela of Bakenkhunsu

In a mid-January 2007 issue of the Egyptian weekly Al-Ahram however, Egyptian antiquity officials announced that a recently discovered and well-preserved quartzite stela belonging to the High Priest of Amun Bakenkhunsu was explicitly dated to Year 4 of Setnakhte's reign. On December 11, 2006, this stela had been discovered along the Avenue of the Sphinxes in Luxor by Mansour Boraik who was excavating there. The Al-Ahram article notes that this data:

contradicts...the official record, which says Setnakhte ruled Egypt for only three years. According to the new information provided by the stela, Setnakhte's reign certainly lasted for four years, and may have continued for [a little] longer.

Zahi Hawass, the former Secretary General of Egypt's Supreme Council of Antiquities, declared the discovery to be one of the most important finds of 2006 because "it adjusts the history of the 20th Dynasty and reveals more about the life of Bakenkhunsu." As Setnakhte's reign was short, he may have come to the throne fairly late in life.

However, the Al-Ahram figure does not change the fact that Setnakhte likely truly ruled Egypt for only three, rather than four, full years since there are no Year 1 dates attested for him, and his famous Year 2 Elephantine stela states that Setnakhte finally secured his kingship after defeating all his opponents and challengers to the throne in his second year. The date of the Elephantine stela in Year 2 II Shemu day 10 of Setnakhte's reign—the date of which is mentioned only halfway in the stela rather than at its start—is immediately followed by this proclamation: "There were no opponents against His Majesty, l.p.h., in all the lands."

This reference to the defeat of Setnakhte's enemies implies that this specific date marked the termination of a conflict—presumably Setnakhte's struggle for the throne—which extended partly into his second year and means that Setnakhte's first year would have overlapped with Twosret's final year, if Twosret was his opponent. Therefore, he likely did not even rule Egypt in his theoretical first year and could only properly administer the country from sometime during his second year. In any event, there was an interregnum lasting at least a year in which no ruler controlled all of Egypt and Setnakhte's effective reign length should be reduced by a year from 4 to 3 years.

Setnakhte's Elephantine stela touches on this chaotic period and refers explicitly to the expulsion of certain Asiatics, who fled Egypt, abandoning the gold which they had looted from Egyptian temples. It is uncertain the degree to which this inscription referred to contemporary events or rather repeated anti-Asiatic sentiment from the reign of Pharaoh Ahmose I. Setnakhte identified with the God Atum or Temu, and built a temple to this God at Per-Atum (Biblical Pithom).

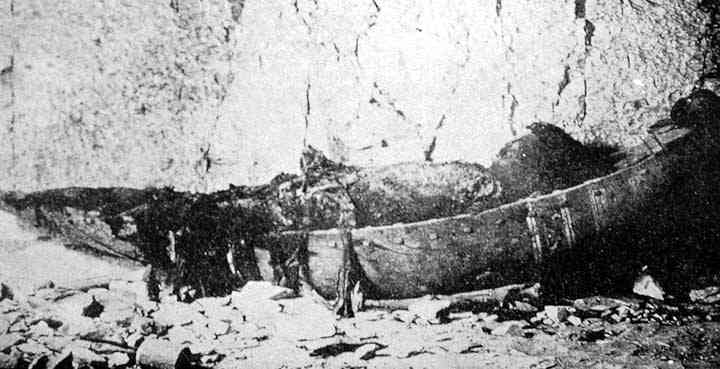
The "mummy in the boat" from KV35, before its destruction

After his death, Setnakhte was buried in KV14 which was originally designed to be Twosret's royal tomb. His mummy has never been identified with certainty, although the so–called "mummy in the boat" found in KV35 was sometimes identified with him, an attribution rejected by Aidan Dodson who rather believes the body belonged to a royal family member of Amenhotep II of the 18th Dynasty. In any case, the mummy was destroyed in a looting in 1901, thus preventing any analysis of it.

== Monuments ==
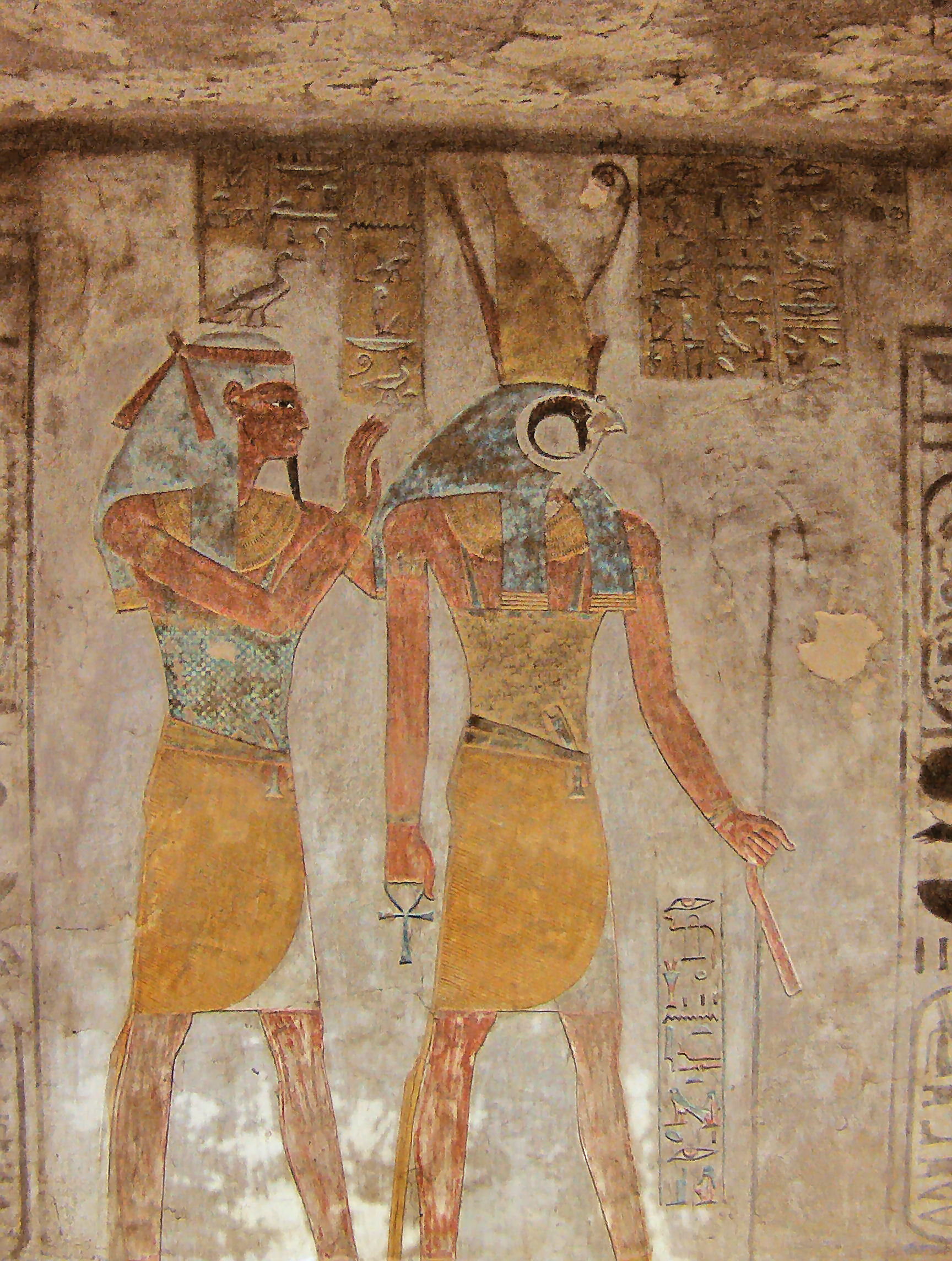
Reliefs of Horus and Geb from tomb KV14

While Setnakhte's reign was still comparatively brief, it was just long enough for him to stabilize the political situation in Egypt and establish his son, Rameses III, as his successor to the throne of Egypt. The Bakenkhunsu stela reveals that it was Setnakhte who began the construction of a Temple of Amun-Re in Karnak which was eventually completed by his son, Ramesses III. Setnakhte also started work on a tomb, KV11, in the Valley of the Kings, but stopped it when the tombcarvers accidentally broke into the tomb of the Nineteenth Dynasty Pharaoh Amenmesse. Setnakhte then appropriated the tomb of Queen Twosret (KV14), his predecessor, for his own use.

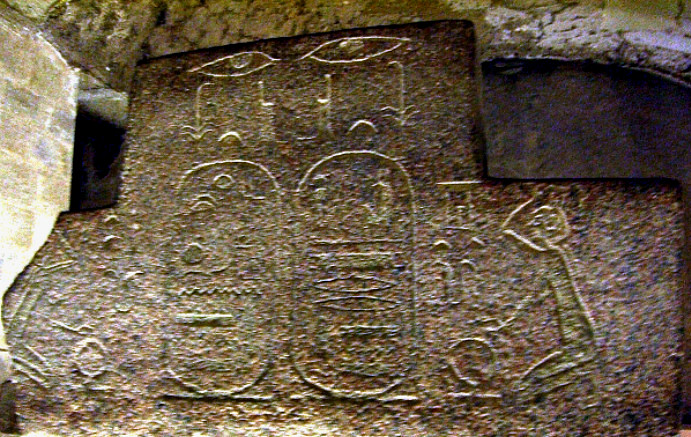
Cartouches of Setnakhte in his tomb in the Valley of the Kings.

== Papyrus Harris ==
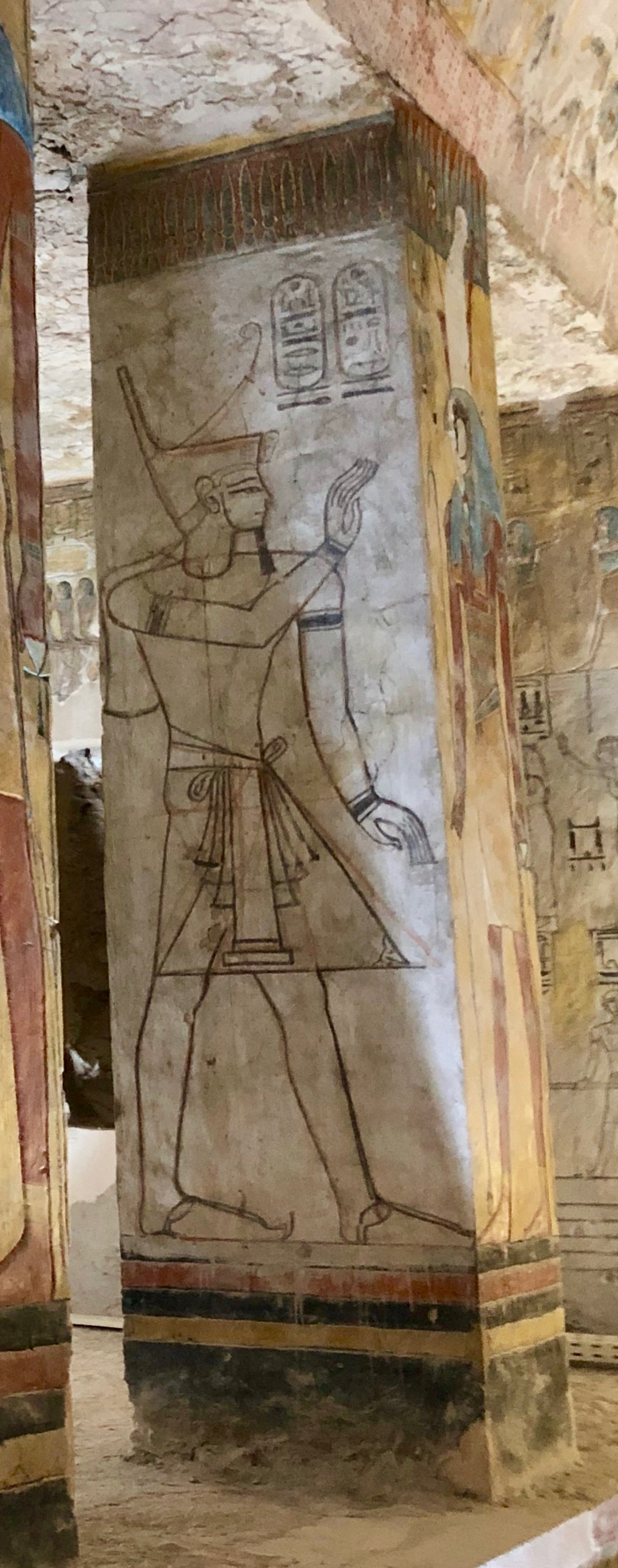
Relief of Setnakhte from tomb KV14, painted over a erased relief of Tausret.

The beginning of the Great Harris Papyrus or Papyrus Harris I, which documents the reign of Ramesses III, provides some details about Setnakhte's rise to power. An excerpt of James Henry Breasted's 1906 translation of this document is provided below:

The land of Egypt was overthrown from without, and every man was thrown out of his right; they had no "chief mouth" for many years formerly until other times. The land of Egypt was in the hands of chiefs and of rulers of towns; one slew his neighbour, great and small. Other times having come after it, with empty years, Irsu ('a self-made man'), a certain Syrian (Kharu) was with them as chief (wr). He set plundering their (i.e., the people's) possessions. They made gods like men, and no offerings were presented in the temples.

But when the gods inclined themselves to peace, to set the land in its rights according to its accustomed manner, they established their son, who came forth from their limbs, to be ruler, LPH, of every land, upon their great throne, Userkhaure-setepenre-meryamun, LPH, the son of Re, Setnakht-merire-meryamun, LPH. He was Khepri-Set, when he is enraged; he set in order the entire land which had been rebellious; he slew the rebels who were in the land of Egypt; he cleansed the great throne of Egypt; he was ruler of the Two Lands, on the throne of Atum. He gave ready faces to those who had been turned away. Every man knew his brother who had been walled in. He established the temples in possession of divine offerings, to offer to the gods according to their customary stipulations.

Until 2000, Chancellor Bay was considered the only plausible candidate for this Irsu. However, an IFAO Ostracon no. 1864 found at Deir el-Medina dated to Year 5 records that 'Pharaoh (Siptah) LPH has killed the great enemy, Bay'. Because Chancellor Bay died at least 3 years before this 'Irsu', he can no longer be considered a plausible candidate for this historical figure.

== Genetics ==
In December 2012, a genetic study conducted by the same researchers who decoded King Tutankhamun's DNA found that Ramesses III, Setnakhte's son and second pharaoh of the Twentieth Dynasty of Egypt belonged to Y-DNA E-V38, alternatively known as haplogroup E1b1a.

== Bibliography ==
- James H. Breasted, Ancient Records of Egypt, Vol No.4,(1906)
- Erik Hornung, Untersuchungen zur Chronologie und Geschichte des Neuen Reiches (1964)
- J. Von Beckerath, Chronologie des Pharaonischen Ägypten, Philip Von Zabern, (Mainz: 1997), pp. 94–98 and pp. 201–202
- Mansour Boraik, CAHIERS DE KARNAK 13 (Stela of Bakenkhonsu with Year 4 date of Setnakhte pp.57-58) PDF 2010
- Kevin Lee Johnson, Transition and Legitimation in Egypt's Nineteenth and Twentieth Dynasties: A Study of the Reigns, of Siptah, Tausret, and Setnakht PDF, The University of Memphis, August 2012
