= Ankh wedja seneb =

Ancient Egyptian hieroglyphic phrase

S34 U28 S29
ankh wedja seneb
ꜥnḫ wḏꜢ snb
in hieroglyphs

Ankh wedja seneb (𓋹𓍑𓋴 ꜥnḫ wḏꜢ snb) or (𓋹𓇅𓋴 ꜥnḫ wḏꜢ snb) is an Egyptian phrase which often appears after the names of pharaohs, in references to their household, or at the ends of letters. The formula consists of three Egyptian hieroglyphs without clarification of pronunciation, making its exact grammatical form difficult to reconstruct. It may be expressed as "life, prosperity, and health" or LFP, but Alan Gardiner proposed that they represented verbs in the stative form: "Be alive, strong, and healthy".

== Components ==
Egyptian hieroglyphs did not record vowel values, making the exact pronunciation of most words unknowable. The conventional Egyptological pronunciations of the words ꜥnḫ, wḏꜢ, and snb are ankh, wedja and seneb respectively.

- Ankh means "life" and "to have life", "to live", particularly with regard to the longevity and resurrection of the ancient Egyptian deities and pharaohs
- Wedja means "to be whole" or "intact", with connotations of "prosperity" and "well-being"
- Seneb means "to be sound", "to be well", "to be healthy"

== Rosetta Stone ==
On the Rosetta Stone (196 BCE), the gods are said to reward the Ptolemaic pharaoh Ptolemy V Epiphanes:

"...The gods and goddesses have given him victory, and power, and life, and strength, and health [A.U.S.], and every beautiful thing of every kind whatsoever..."
R9 R9 R9 X7 W24 Z9 D40 N35 M3 Aa1 X1 S34 U28 S29 F18 D21 Aa1 X1 V30 nfr D21 F40 O34 N35 Z2
ΔΕΔΩΚΑΣΙΝ ΑΥΤΩΙ ΟΙ ΘΕΟΙ ΥΓΙΕΙΑΝ ΝΙΚΗΝ ΚΡΑΤΟΣ ΚΑΙ ΤΑ ΑΛΛ ΑΓΑΘ[Α...]

== See also ==
- Ankh
