= Moses and Monotheism =

1939 book by Sigmund Freud

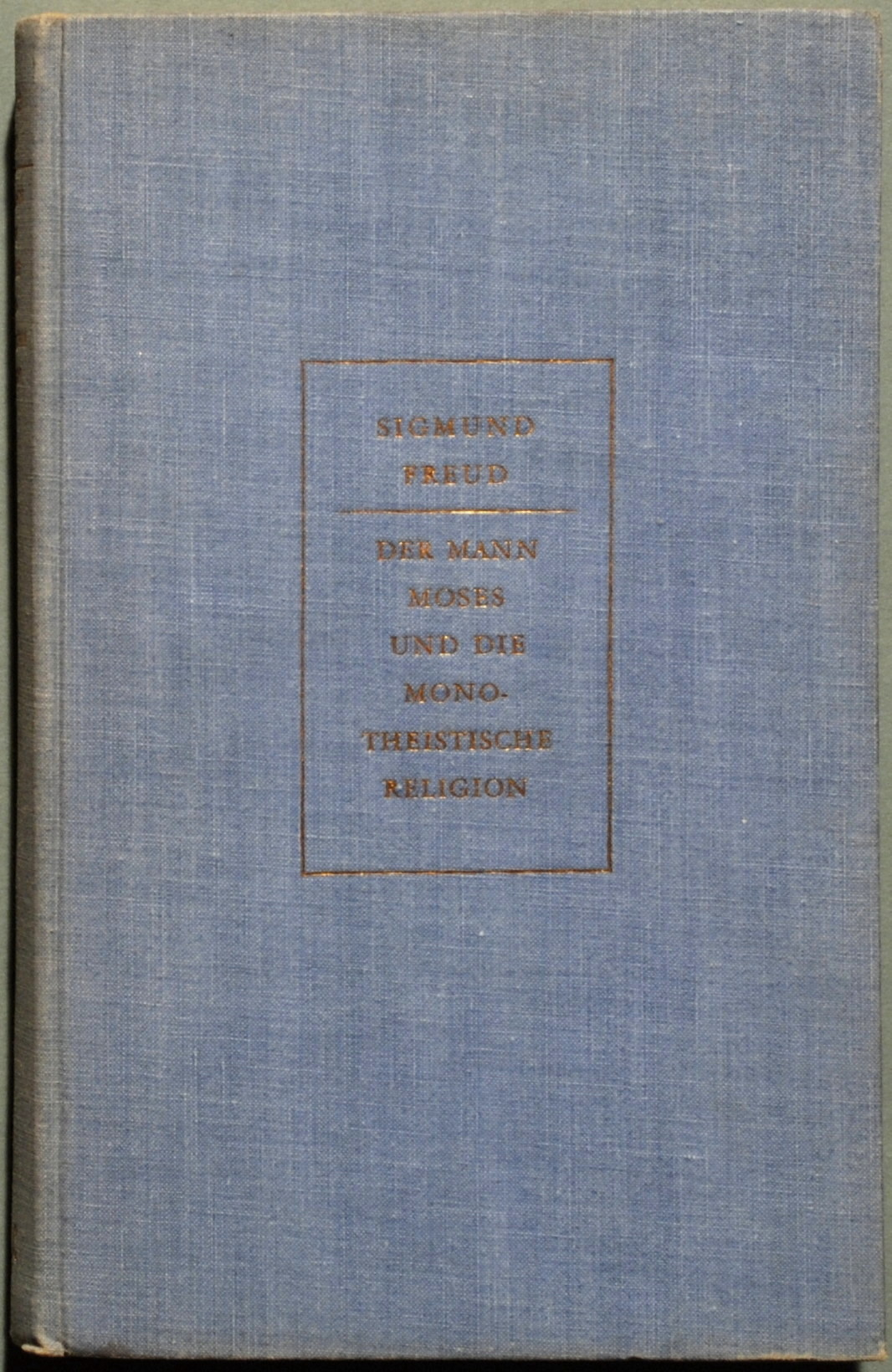
- Cover of the first edition
- Author: Sigmund Freud
- Original title: Der Mann Moses und die monotheistische Religion
- Translator: Katherine Jones
- Language: German
- Subject: Egyptology; Monotheism
- Publisher: Hogarth Press
- Publication date: 1939
- English publication date: 1939
- Media type: Print
- Pages: 223 (first edition)
- OCLC: 1065146858
- Dewey Decimal: 221.92
- LC Class: BS580 .M6
- Preceded by: Civilization and Its Discontents
- Original text: Der Mann Moses und die monotheistische Religion at Project Gutenberg
- Translation: Moses and Monotheism at Internet Archive

Moses and Monotheism (German: Der Mann Moses und die monotheistische Religion, lit. 'The man Moses and the monotheist religion') is a 1939 book about the origins of monotheism written by Sigmund Freud, the founder of psychoanalysis. It is Freud's final original work and it was completed in the summer of 1939 when Freud was practically already "writing from his death-bed." It appeared in English translation the same year.

Moses and Monotheism shocked many of its readers because of Freud's suggestion that Moses was actually born into an Egyptian household, rather than being born as a Hebrew slave and merely raised in the Egyptian royal household as a ward (as recounted in the Book of Exodus). Freud proposed that Moses had been a priest of Akhenaten who fled Egypt after the pharaoh's death and perpetuated monotheism through a different religion, and that he was murdered by his followers, who then via reaction formation revered him and became irrevocably committed to the monotheistic idea he represented.

== Summary ==
The book consists of three essays and is an extension of Freud's work on psychoanalytic theory as a means of generating hypotheses about historical events, in combination with his obsessive fascination with Egyptological scholarship, archaeology, and antiquities. Freud hypothesizes that Moses was not Hebrew, but actually born into Ancient Egyptian nobility and was probably a follower of Akhenaten, "the world's earliest recorded monotheist."

In Freud's retelling of the events, Moses led only his close followers into freedom (during an unstable period in Ancient Egyptian history after Akhenaten's death ca. 1350 BCE), that they subsequently killed the Egyptian Moses in rebellion, and still later joined with another monotheistic tribe in Midian who worshipped a volcano god called Yahweh. Freud supposed that the monotheistic solar god Aten of the Egyptian Moses was fused with Yahweh, the Midianite volcano god, and that the deeds of Moses were ascribed to a Midianite priest who also came to be called Moses.

Freud explains that centuries after, the rebels regretted the murder of the Egyptian Moses and created the concept of the Messiah hoping for the return of Moses as the Saviour of the Israelites.

Freud claimed that repressed (or censored) collective guilt stemming from the murder of Moses was passed down through the generations; leading the Jews to neurotic expressions of legalistically religious sentiment to disperse or cope with their inheritance of trauma and guilt. In many respects, the book reiterates the theogony that Freud first argued in Totem and Taboo, as Freud acknowledges in the text of Moses & Monotheism on several occasions. For example, he writes:

"[This] conviction I acquired when I wrote my book on Totem and Taboo (1912), and it has only become stronger since. From then on, I have never doubted that religious phenomena are to be understood only on the model of the neurotic symptoms of the individual, which are so familiar to us, as a return of long forgotten important happenings in the primeval history of the human family, that they owe their obsessive character to that very origin and therefore derive their effect on mankind from the historical truth that they contain."

== Reception ==
According to the historian of religion Kimberly B. Stratton, in Moses and Monotheism Freud "posits a primal act of murder as the origin of religion, and specifically ties the memory (and repression) of it to the exodus story and birth of biblical monotheism". The mythologist Joseph Campbell wrote that Freud's suggestion that Moses was an Egyptian "delivered a shock to many of his admirers". According to Campbell, Freud's proposal was widely attacked, "both with learning and without." Campbell himself refrained from passing judgment on Freud's views about Moses, although he considered Freud's willingness to publish his work despite its potential offensiveness "noble".

Mikkel Borch-Jacobsen and Sonu Shamdasani argued that, in Moses and Monotheism, Freud applied to history "the same method of interpretation that he used in the privacy of his office to 'reconstruct' his patients' forgotten and repressed memories." The Anglican theologian Rowan Williams stated that Freud's accounts of the origins of Judaism are "painfully absurd", and that Freud's explanations are not scientific but rather "imaginative frameworks".

Biblical archaeologist William Foxwell Albright dismissed Freud's book by stating that it "is totally devoid of serious historical method and deals with historical data even more cavalierly than with the data of instrospective and experimental psychology". More recently, Israeli archaeologist Aren Maier was also critical toward Freud's work and called his analysis "simplistic and largely incorrect", while Egyptologist Brian Murray Fagan stated that it "had no basis in historical fact". Egyptologist Donald Bruce Redford wrote in 2015:

Before much of the archaeological evidence from Thebes and from Tell el-Amarna became available, wishful thinking sometimes turned Akhenaten into a humane teacher of the true God, a mentor of Moses, a christlike figure, a philosopher before his time. But these imaginary creatures are now fading away as the historical reality gradually emerges. There is little or no evidence to support the notion that Akhenaten was a progenitor of the full-blown monotheism that we find in the Bible.

== See also ==
- Joseph and His Brothers, novel by Thomas Mann
- The Egyptian, novel by Mika Waltari
- PDF
