= Papyrus Harris I =

Manuscript

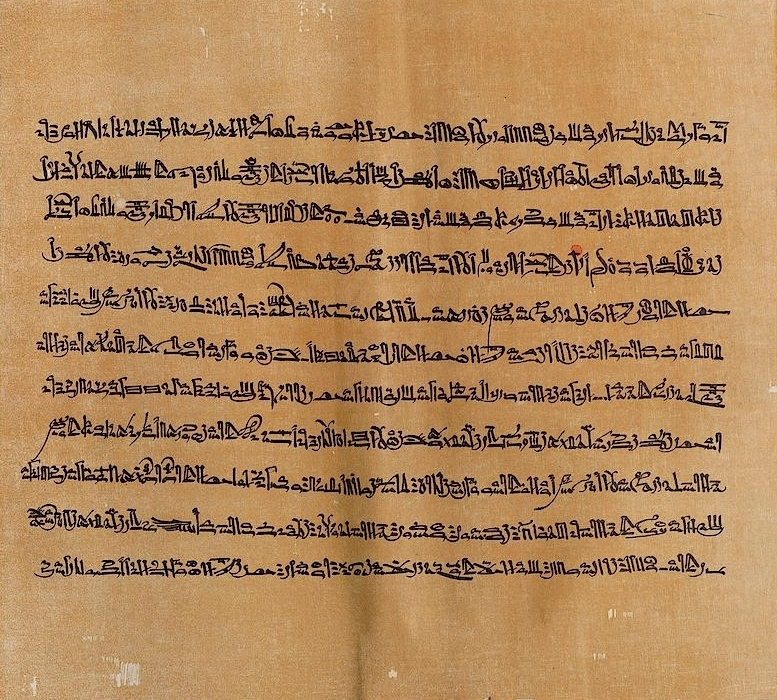
- Papyrus Harris I Pl. LXXVI
- Size: length: 41 meters
- Writing: Egyptian hieratic
- Created: c. 1152 BC
- Discovered: 1855; Medinet Habu, Egypt
- Present location: British Museum, London

The Harris I Papyrus, also known as the Great Harris Papyrus, is an ancient Egyptian text dating to the reign of Ramesses III. Its technical designation is "Papyrus British Museum EA 9999". At 41 metres (136 ft) long, it is the longest known papyrus from Egypt and contains approximately 1,500 lines of text." It dates to the 20th Dynasty and recalls the end of the 19th.

Almost all the papyri in Harris's collection come from the same find, dating to the 20th Dynasty. The Arab seekers who presented them to Harris in 1855 showed him a sackful of papyri which they claimed had been found by them at the foot of the southern escarpment of the small valley that leads from Medinet Habu, (Note: The house of the king, Ra-user-ma, beloved of Amen the living, in the house of Amen ) to Deir el-Medina in the same cache, a sort of cave twenty feet below a layer of clay mixed with pottery shards, where the bundle of twenty papyri had been found. (Note: The "Harris Magical Papyrus" was also find there.) The papyrus labelled Harris 1 was the longest of them and relatively well preserved. It is probable that this mass of papyri came from the archives of the temple of Medinet Habu, the administrative center of Ramesses III.

The papyrus consists of 79 long pages of beautiful hieratic script; the first gives the date, which is the 32nd year of the reign of Ramses III; this is the earliest date of that reign that we do not yet know with certainty. The following pages list the pious foundations of Ramsses III in all parts of Egypt and the considerable wealth which this pharaoh bestowed on each of the principal temples. In the last five pages the king himself gives a historical account of the events of his reign. The pharaoh's speech contains fifteen paragraphs, which have been translated and discussed separately.

The historical reflections at the end of the scroll include an account of a civil war erupting in the 19th dynasty and leading to the foundation of a 20th dynasty Egypt, coming to a climax with an encounter between the Pharaonic army and an invasion of the Sea-Peoples who join together with an uprising of slaves in battle with the Pharaoh on the coast of Egypt. Similarities and differences between this section of the scroll and accounts of the Exodus, and of Oserseph's rebellion in Manetho, have sometimes been remarked upon.

== Text processing ==
The greater portion of the text has already been translated and has appeared in print. The historical portion was published by Eisenlohr and Chabas the whole, except the lists of objects given to the temples, by Erman. The facsimile of the text and all plates of the hieratic text was published by Birch 1876. The dictionary of the Harris Papyrus elaboreted by Karl Piehl.
The text on the 79 plates can be distinguished into three groups:
A: Prayers to gods, followed by a narration of the main buildings and gifts;
B: The wealth of the temples;

- taxes of the subjects;
- royal gifts;
- sacrificial grain for the festivals;
- offerings for the festivals instituted by the king;
- Nile god offerings;
- idols dedicated by private individuals and entrusted by the king to Amun.

C: The closing prayer & historical recollections

== The assets and income of the temples ==
The balance of assets focuses on three influential temples in Thebes dedicated to the god Amun (tablets 2-23), the temple in Heliopolis to the god Ra (tablets 24–42) and the temple in Memphis (tablets 43-56). It is substantively concentrated in three groups:

- Compilation of the possessions, livestock, gardens, fields, ships, shipyards, and local chieftains that the Pharaoh gave to the house of the god as a perpetual possession.
- Mandatory deliveries, dues from all subjects of the temples, which the king has given to their treasuries, storehouses, and barns as their annual tax."
- The things, livestock, gardens, fields, ships, shipyards, towns, and all (other) things that the king gave to the gods of Upper and Lower Egypt.

An excerpt from the data of the Harris Papyrus on the proportion of property and persons within the jurisdiction of temples;
| Temple center | Cultivated land – area in acres (Note: akr 4047㎡) | Persons responsible for the temple | Number of cattles | Gardens and forests | Number of ships | Number of workshops | Number of cities |
| Thebes | 583 313 | 84 486 | 421 362 | 433 | 83 | 46 | 56 |
| Heliopolis | 108 057 | 12 364 | 45 544 | 64 | 3 | 5 | 103 |
| Memphis | 6 853 | 3 079 | 10 047 | 5 | 2 | 2 | 1 |
| Small temples(c. 27objects) | 24 308 | 5 686 | 13 433 | 11 | 11 | 0 | 0 |
| Total | 722 531 | 105 615 | 490 386 | 513 | 99 | 53 | 160 |

It must therefore be concluded that the gods of Thebes must have owned at least one-tenth of the land and one-hundredth of the population, and that the gods of Heliopolis and Memphis may have owned at least one-fiftieth of the land and one-five hundredth of the population. The temples were therefore very rich, but not so rich as to necessarily pose a threat to the state. If the Ramessesian state eventually had to surrender to the high priests of Amun, then the economic weight of the temples alone certainly did not bring about this phenomenon, and other factors must have been involved, as is the usual interpretation of this part of Egyptian history. (Note: The wealth of the temples also includes resources from previous dynasties.) The temple at Thebes administered 80% of the land and 86% of all livestock for the temples. In Egypt, a total of ~9 million inhabitants and ~5 million acres of cultivated land are reported for the given period. Thus, 14.5% of the land was under the jurisdiction of all the temples, but only ~1% of the population. The dominance of the temple of Amun in Thebes and the resulting enduring ambitions for power are clear evidence.

== Text ==
The hieratic text of the papyrus consists of a list of temple endowments and a brief summary of the entire period of the Ramesses III reign, from his first to his thirty-second year. The Papyrus itself was written in the reign of his son and successor Ramesses IV (Ramessu heqa Maat mery Amun), and the elaborate account of the merits of his father and grandfather shows that political considerations entered into the object of its composition. The style of writing is remarkably clear and easy, and in its short and limpid sentences it resembles the historical texts found on the monuments and temples. The introductory text on the 1st and 2nd lines of the 1st tablet, the death of Ramesses recorded:

The year 32, the 6th of the month Epiphi, (Note: November) of the reign of the king of Upper and Lower Egypt, User Maat Ra, mery Amun, (Note: Strong is the Maat of Ra, beloved of Amun) beloved of Amun, the Son of the Sun, Ramesses ruler of An, (Note: Heliopolis) the living, beloved of all the gods and goddesses, the king crowned in the white crown, like Osiris, the luminous ruler of An like Turn over (Note: God of the earth) the great houses in the land of Taser, (Note: name of an entrance to afterlife) coming forever and eternity as king of the deep, the king of Upper and Lower Egypt, User Maat Ra, mery Amun beloved of Amen, Son of the Sun, Ramesses, ruler of An, the living, the great god.

The papyrus ends with Table LXXVI, which describes Ramesses’s achievements in stabilizing an internal living conditions of the unified Egypt and especially his merits in protecting borders of the empire and defeating external enemies in numerous military campaigns:

The Libyans and the Meshwesh were dwelling in Egypt, having plundered the cities of the western shore from Memphis to Kerben (near Abukir). They had reached the great river on both its banks. They were the ones who plundered the cities of Egwowe (Canopus) during very many years while they were in Egypt. Behold, I destroyed them, slain at one time.

Laid low the Meshwesh, the Libyans, the Esbet, the Keykesh, and the Beken; they were overthrown in their blood and made heaps. I turned them back from trampling the border of Egypt. I carried away those whom my sword spared, as numerous captives, pinioned like birds before my horses: their wives and their children by the ten thousand, and their cattle in number like hundred-thousands. I settled their leaders in strongholds in my name. I gave to them captains of archers and chief men of the tribes, branded and made into slaves, impressed with my name; their wives and their children were made likewise. I led their cattle into the house of Amon; they were made for him into herds forever.

The last tablet LXXIX of the papyrus contains the father's inheritance of titles and the rule of the country to his son Ramesses IV:

Amen has placed my son upon my throne. He receives my title in peace as ruler of the two countries, seated on the throne of Harmachis (Note: Horus on the horizon) lord of the two countries. He has adjusted the diadem like Tanen (Note: god Ptah) User Maat Ra, mery Amun (Ramesses III), the living, the eldest son of Ra, has engendered himself, Heqa Maat Ra, setep en Amun, (Note: Ruler of the Maat like Ra, the chosen one of Amun) (Ramesses IV) beloved of Amun the living and the child, the son of Amun, emanating from his limbs, crowned as lord of the two countries like Tatanen,. (Note: Menphis offering god) He, as a son, is truly praised by his father; attached to his sandals, be prostrate before him.

Epigraphic analysis of the hieratic text revealed that at least three scribes contributed to the written text, the largest part of which was a typist from Thebes, two others from Heliopolis and Memephis. The three colored images are single artist-painted images. It is presumed that "this magnificent manuscript" must have been created so hastily that there was no time for one scribe to evenly copy all 79 large pages. The manuscript was created in parts and glued together.

== Gallery ==
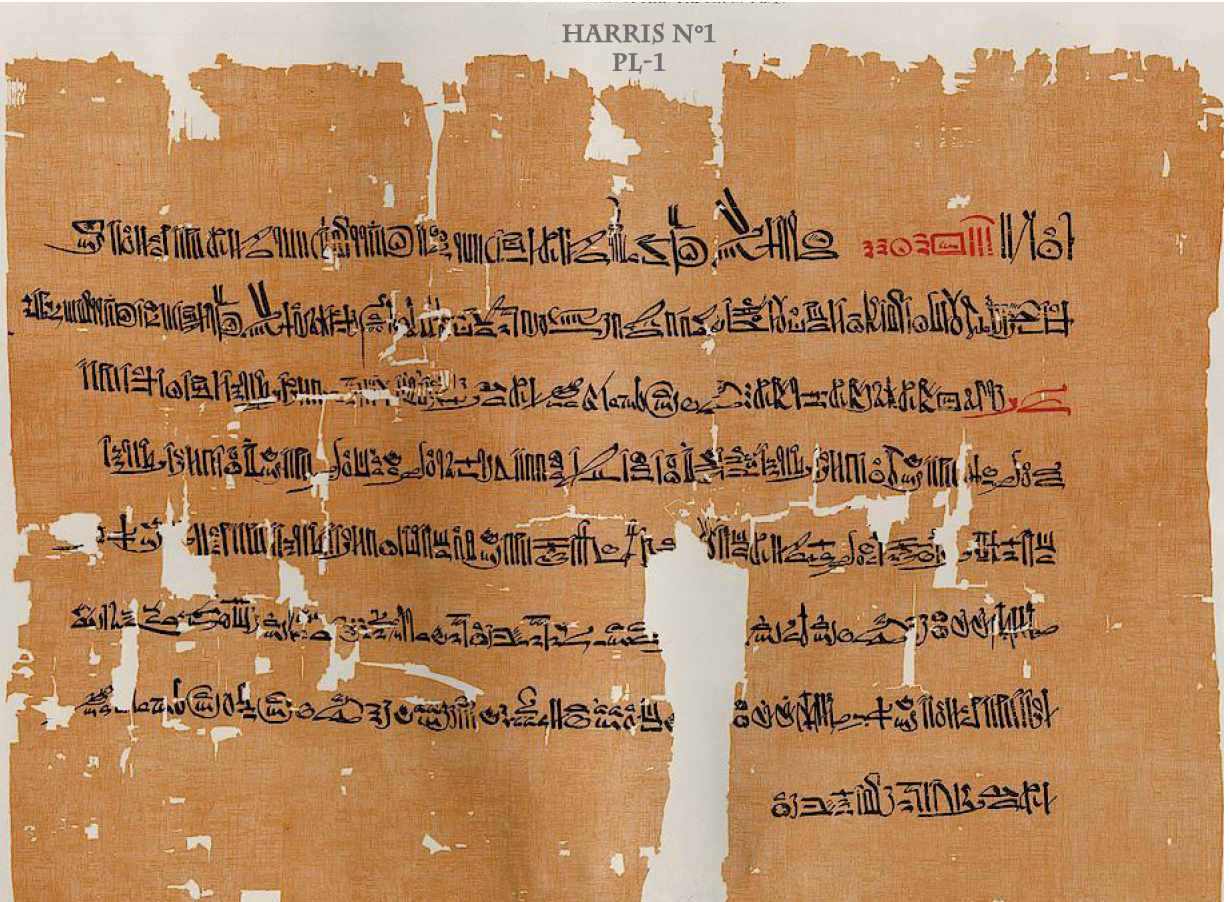
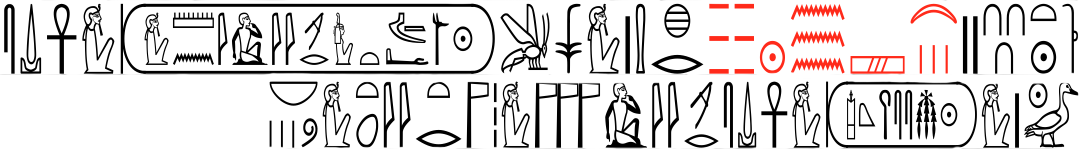
Papyrus Harris 1, Plate I, the 1st. row's transcription

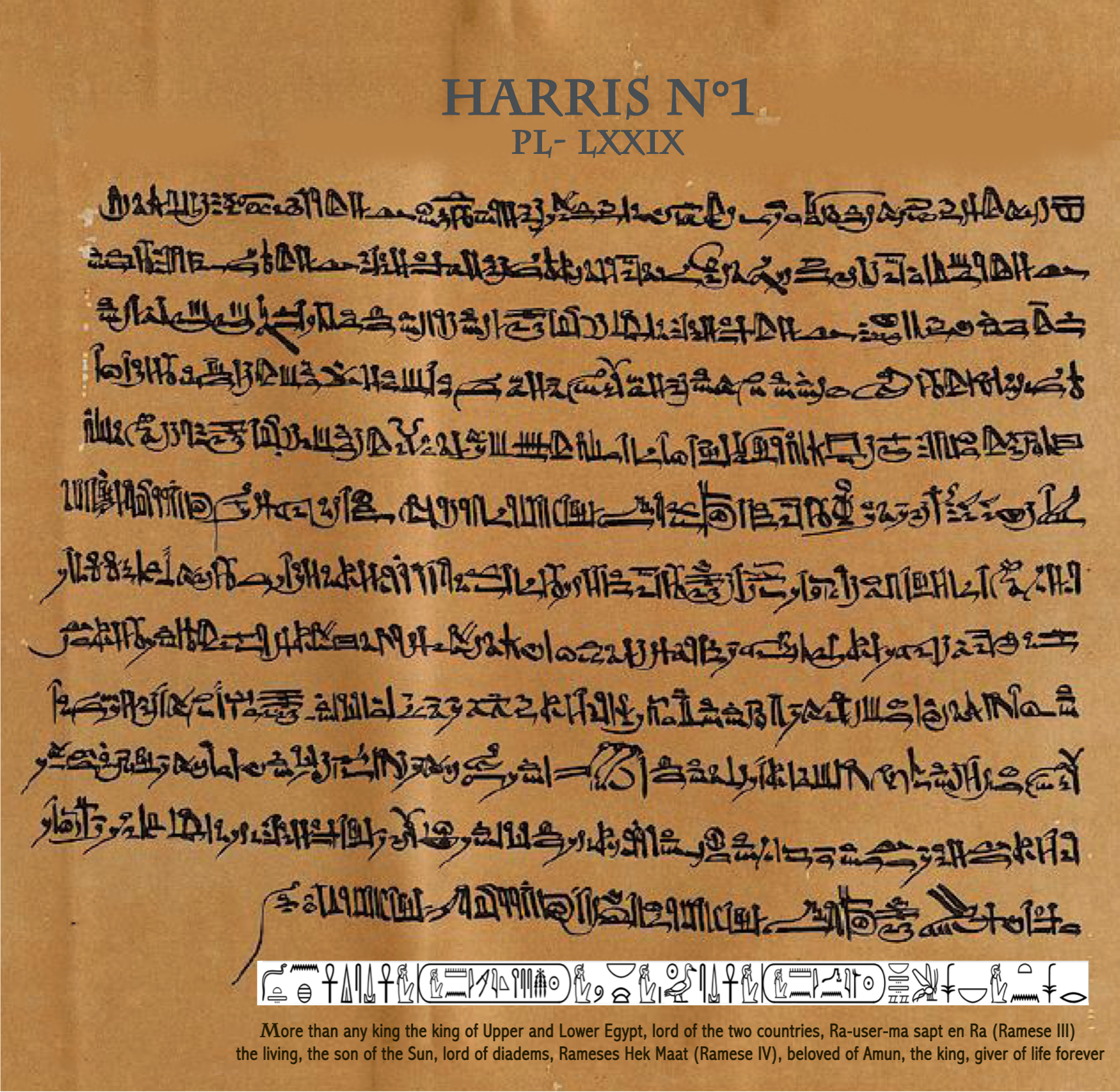
Harris 1, tablet LXXIX, hieroglyphic transcription of the last line and its translation

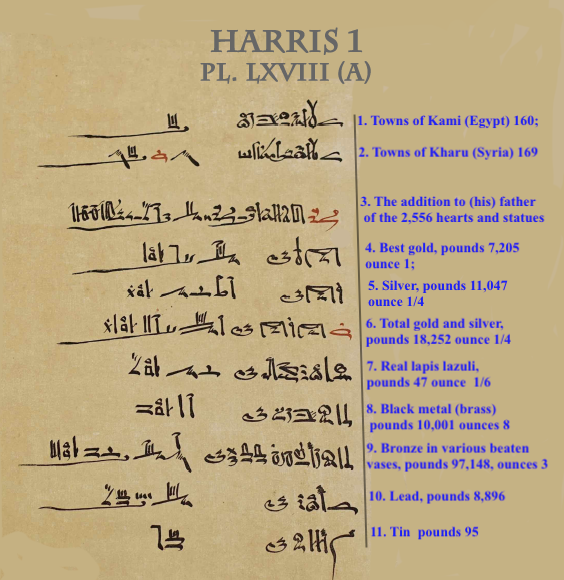
Papyrus Harris - tablet LXVIII(a);Thebes property items

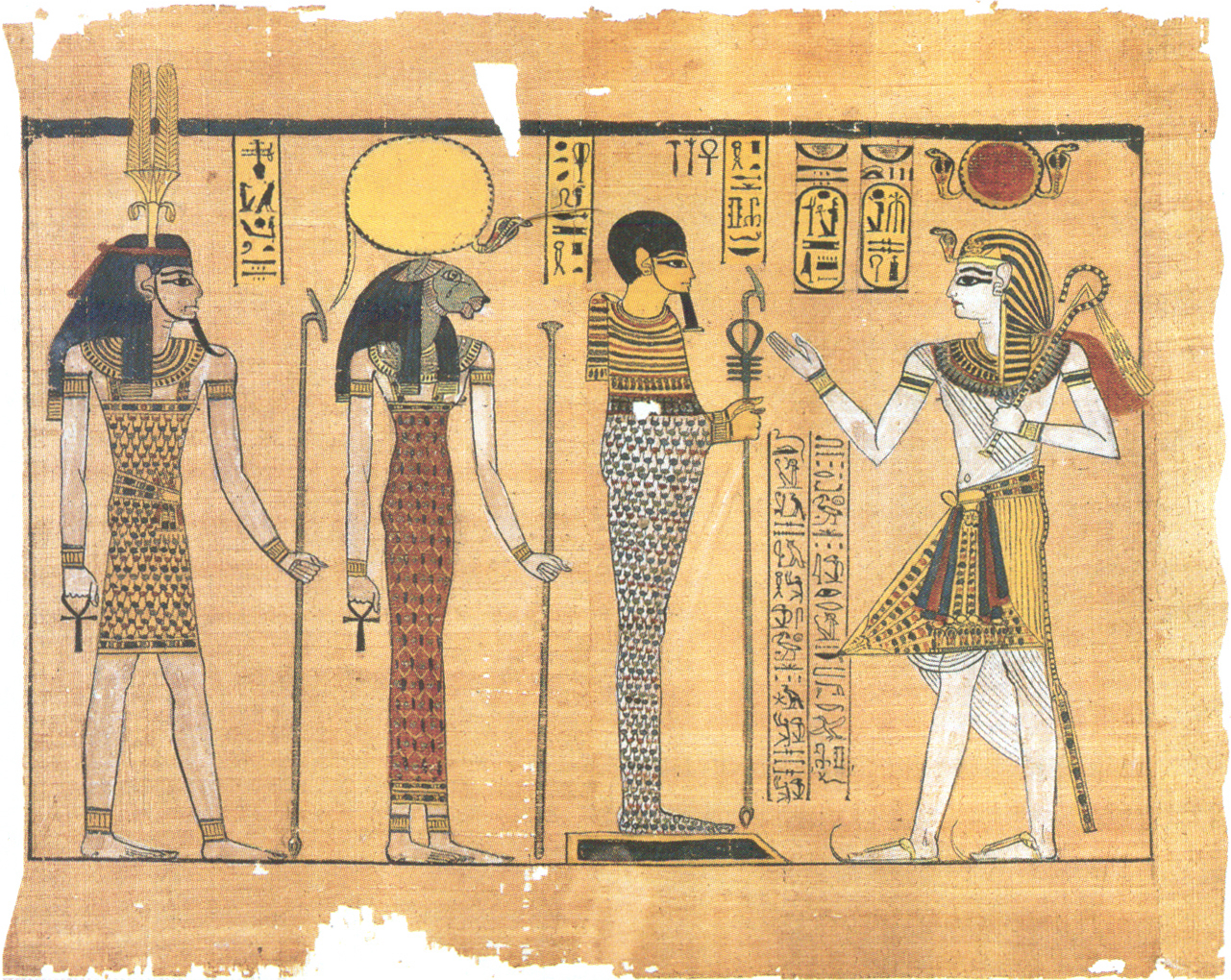
Ramesses III before The Memphite Triad (from the left) Nefertum, Sekhmet, Ptah

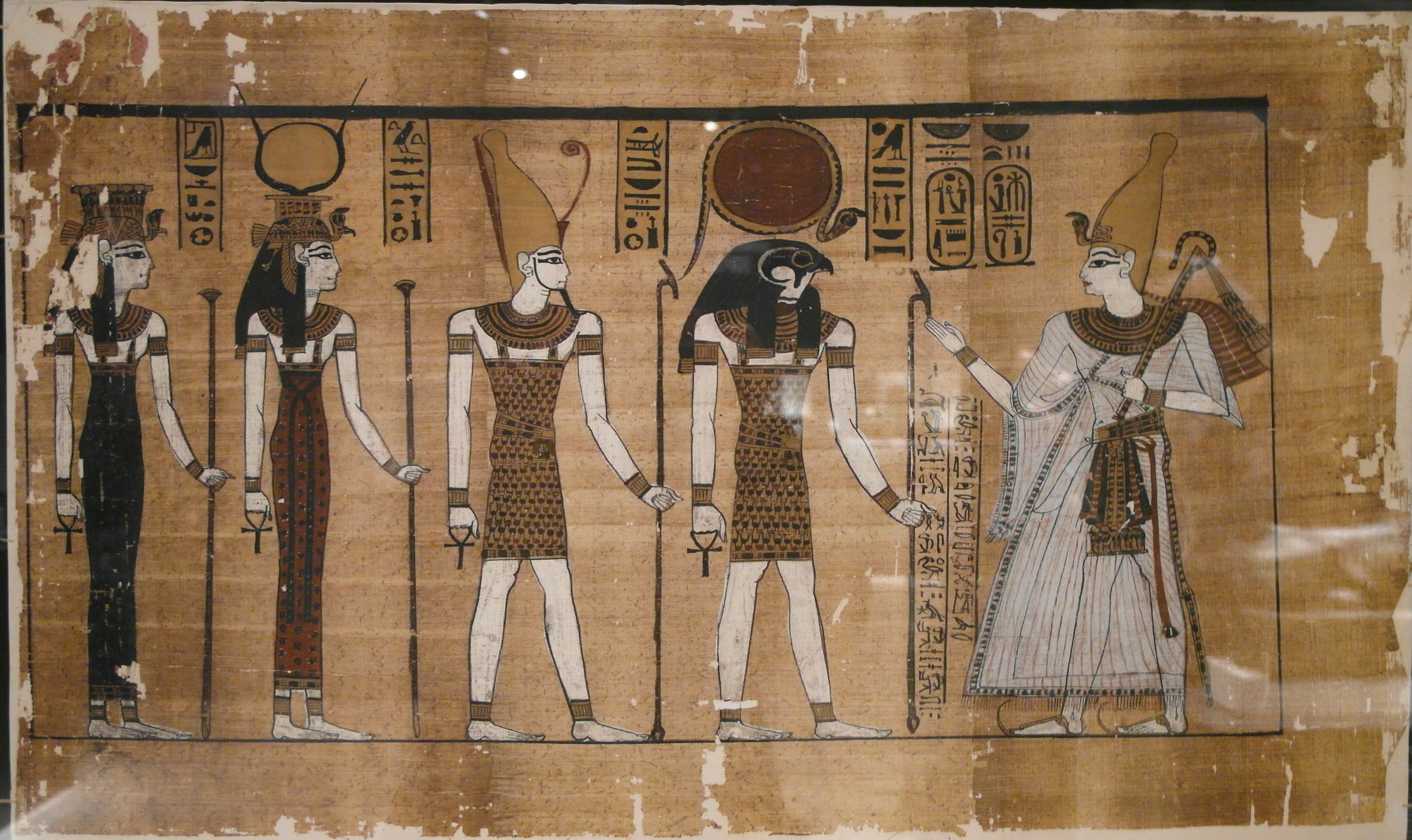
Ramses III before gods of Heliopolis: Ra-Horakhty, Atum, Iusaas and Hathor.

== See also ==
- List of ancient Egyptian papyri
- Rhind Mathematical Papyrus
- Papyrus Amherst 63
- Papyrus Harris 500

== Other available literature ==
- Peden Alex. " 1991. The Reign of Ramesses IV"" University of Liverpool
- Erichsen, Wolja. 1933. Papyrus Harris I: hieroglyphische Transkription. Bibliotheca aegyptiaca 5. Brussel: Fondation égyptologique reine Élisabeth
- Grandet, Pierre. 1994. Le papyrus Harris I (BM 9999). 2 vols. Bibliothèque d'Étude 109/1–2. Cairo: Imprimerie de l'Institut français d'archéologie orientale du Caire
- Grandet, Pierre. 1999. Le papyrus Harris I: Glossaire. Bibliothèque d'Étude 129. Cairo: Imprimerie de l'Institut français d'archéologie orientale du Caire
- Khan Dan’el. 2010. "Who is Meddling in Egypt’s Affairs? The Identity of the Asiatics in the Elephantine Stele of Sethnakhte and the Historicity of the Medinet Habu Asiatic War Relief". University of Haifa
