= History of ancient Egypt =

Period of Egyptian history

Ancient Egypt spans the period of Egyptian history from the early prehistoric settlements of the northern Nile valley to the Roman conquest of Egypt in 30 BC. The pharaonic period, the period in which Egypt was ruled by a pharaoh, is dated from the 32nd century BC, when Upper and Lower Egypt were unified, until the country fell under Macedonian rule in 332 BC.

== Chronology ==
Note
For alternative 'revisions' to the chronology of Egypt, see Egyptian chronology.

Egypt's history is split into several different periods according to the ruling dynasty of each pharaoh. The dating of events is still a subject of research. The conservative dates are not supported by any reliable absolute date for a span of about three millennia. The following is the list according to conventional Egyptian chronology.

- Prehistoric Egypt (prior to 3100 BC)
- Naqada III ("the protodynastic period", approximately 3100–3000 BC; sometimes referred to as "Dynasty 0")
- Early Dynastic Period (First–Second Dynasties)
- Old Kingdom (Third–Sixth Dynasties)
- First Intermediate Period (Seventh or Eighth–Eleventh Dynasties)
- Middle Kingdom (Twelfth–Thirteenth Dynasties)
- Second Intermediate Period (Fourteenth–Seventeenth Dynasties)
- New Kingdom (Eighteenth–Twentieth Dynasties)
- Third Intermediate Period (also known as the Libyan Period; Twenty-first–Twenty-fifth Dynasties)
- Late Period (Twenty-sixth–Thirty-first Dynasties)
- Ptolemaic Egypt (305–30 BC)

== Neolithic Egypt ==
=== Neolithic period ===
The Nile has been the lifeline for Egyptian culture since nomadic hunter-gatherers began living along it during the Pleistocene. Traces of these early people appear in the form of artefacts and rock carvings along the terraces of the Nile and in the oases.

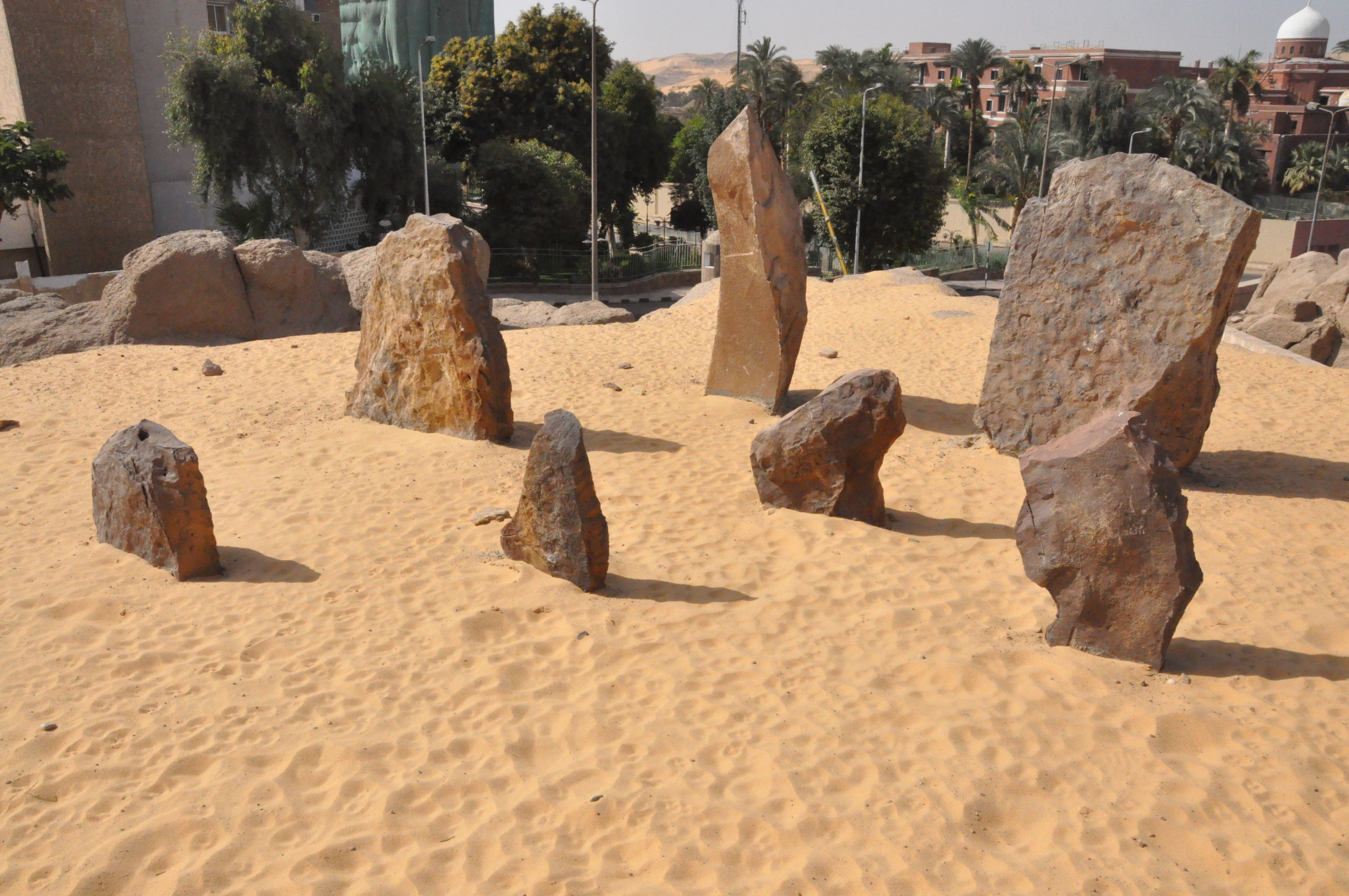
Megaliths from Nabta Playa displayed in Aswan, Upper Egypt

Along the Nile in the 12th millennium BC, an Upper Paleolithic grain-grinding culture using the earliest type of sickle blades had replaced the culture of hunting, fishing, and hunter-gatherers using stone tools. Despite evidence indicating human habitation and cattle herding in the southwestern corner of Egypt near the Sudan border before the 8th millennium BC, the idea of an independent bovine domestication event in Africa must be abandoned because subsequent evidence gathered over a period of thirty years has failed to corroborate this.

Archaeological evidence has attested that population settlements occurred in Nubia as early as the Late Pleistocene era and from the 5th millennium BC onwards, whereas there is "no or scanty evidence" of human presence in the Egyptian Nile valley during these periods, which may be due to problems in site preservation.

The oldest-known domesticated cattle remains in Africa are from the Faiyum c. 4400 BC. Geological evidence and computer climate modeling studies suggest that natural climate changes around the 8th millennium BC began to desiccate the extensive pastoral lands of North Africa, eventually forming the Sahara by the 25th century BC.

Continued desiccation forced the early ancestors of the Egyptians to settle around the Nile more permanently and forced them to adopt a more sedentary lifestyle. However, the period from 9th to the 6th millennium BC has left very little in the way of archaeological evidence.

Mainstream scholars have situated the ethnicity and the origins of predynastic, southern Egypt as a foundational community primarily in northeast Africa which included the Sudan, tropical Africa and the Sahara whilst recognising the population variability that became characteristic of the pharaonic period. Pharaonic Egypt featured a physical gradation across the regional populations, with Upper Egyptians having shared more biological affinities with Sudanese and southernly African populations, whereas Lower Egyptians had closer genetic links with Levantine and Mediterranean populations.

=== Prehistoric Egypt ===
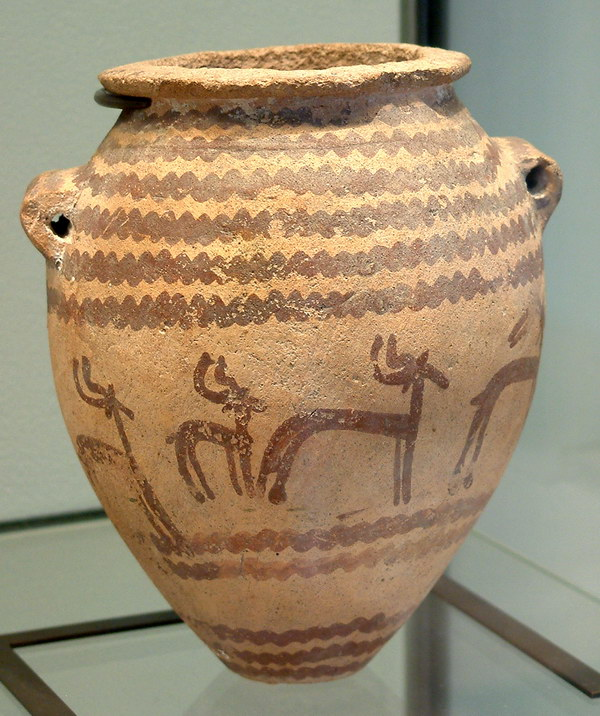
A Gerzeh culture vase decorated with gazelles, on display at the Louvre.

The Nile valley was unfit for habitation until the land had begun to be cleared and irrigated, which was largely underway by the 6th millennium. By that time, Nile society was engaged in organized agriculture and the construction of large buildings.

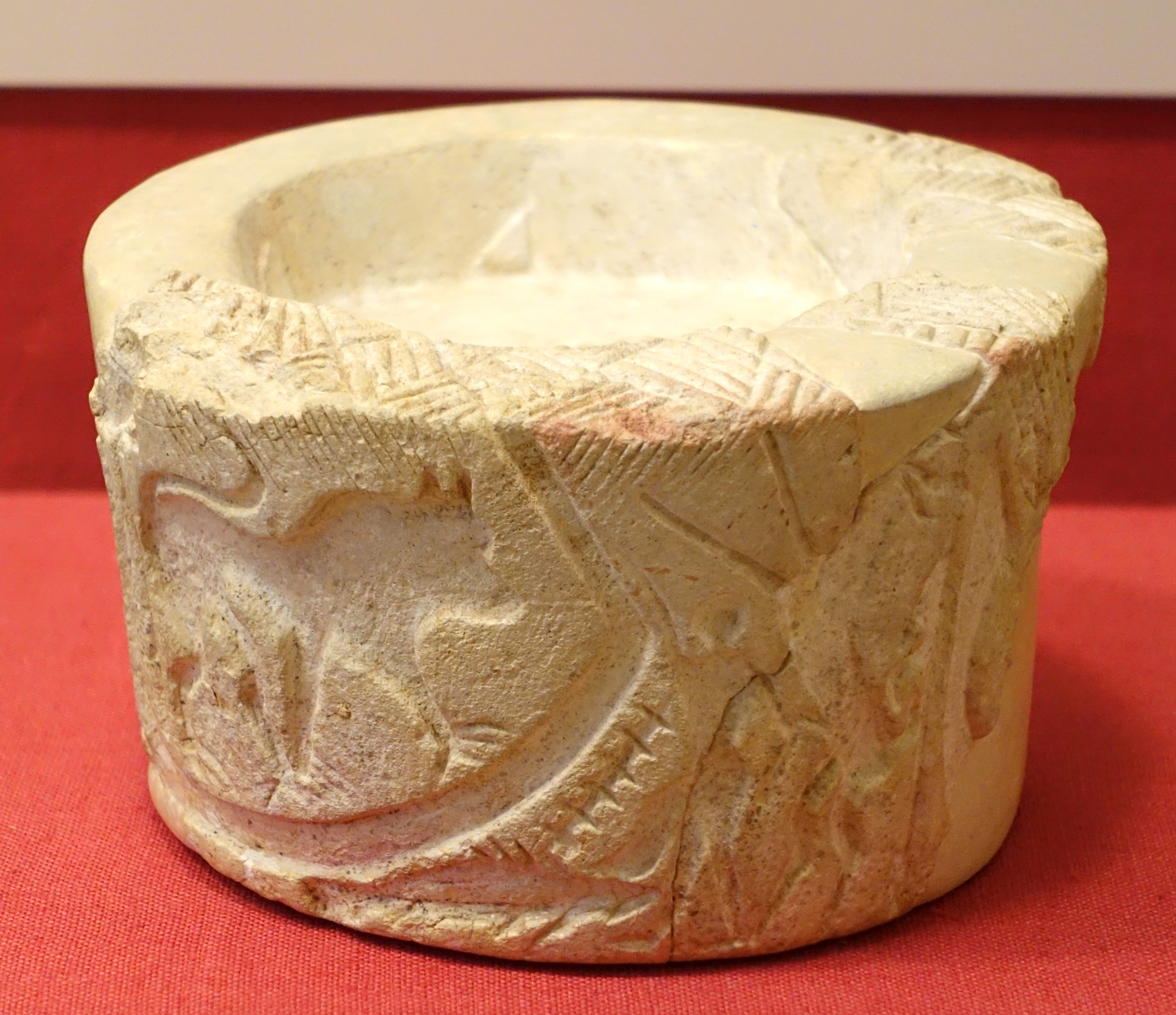
Qustul Incense Burner, excavated from a royal Nubian tomb in Lake Nasser, considered among the earliest representations of the White Crown Hedjet in Upper Egypt.

At this time, Egyptians in the southwestern corner of Egypt were herding cattle and also constructing large buildings. Mortar was in use by the 4th millennium. The people of the valley and the Nile Delta were self-sufficient and were raising barley and emmer, an early variety of wheat, and stored these in pits lined with reed mats. They raised cattle, goats, and pigs and wove linen and baskets. Prehistory continues through this time, variously held to begin with the Amratian culture.

Between 5500 BC and the 31st century BC, small settlements flourished along the Nile, whose delta empties into the Mediterranean Sea.

The Tasian culture was the next to appear; it existed in Upper Egypt starting about 4500 BC. This group is named for the burials found at Deir Tasa, a site on the east bank of the Nile between Asyut and Akhmim. The Tasian culture is notable for producing the earliest blacktop-ware, a type of red and brown pottery painted black on its top and interior.

The Badari culture, named for the Badari site near Deir Tasa, followed the Tasian; however, similarities cause many to avoid differentiating between them at all. The Badari culture continued to produce the kind of pottery called blacktop-ware (although its quality was much improved over previous specimens), and was assigned the sequence dating numbers between 21 and 29. The significant difference, however, between the Tasian and Badari, which prevents scholars from completely merging the two, is that Badari sites are Chalcolithic while the Tasian sites remained Neolithic and are thus considered technically part of the Stone Age.

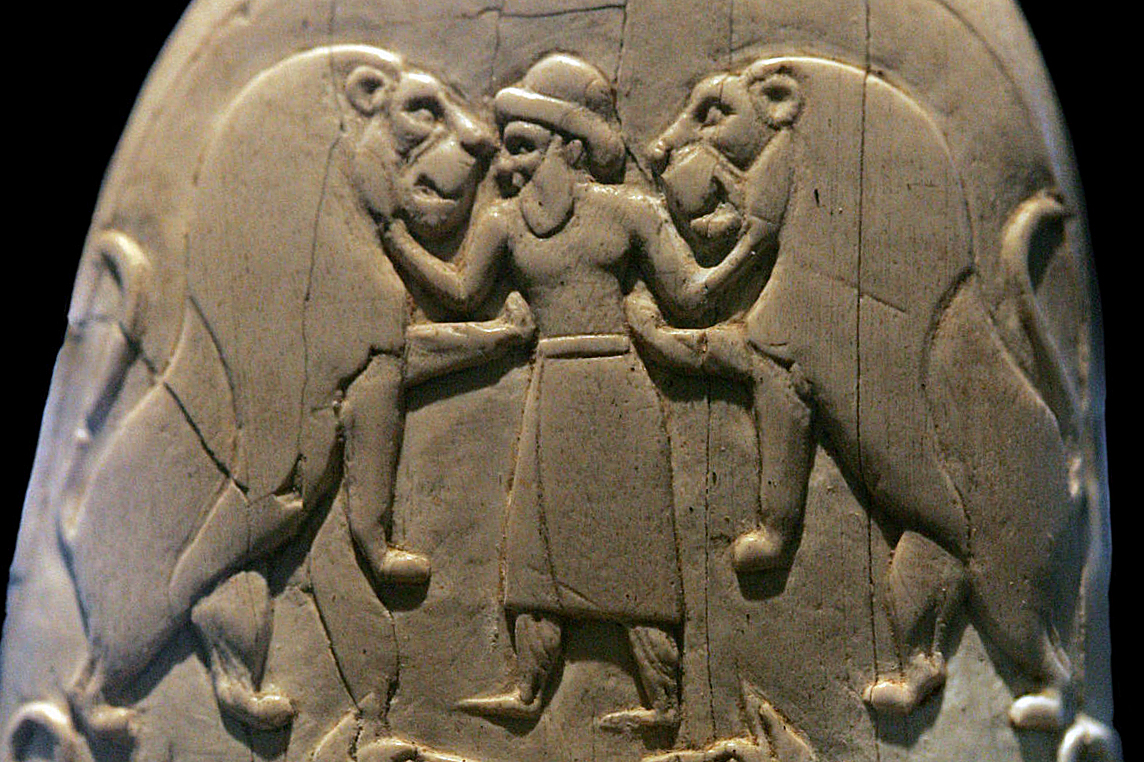
Mesopotamian king as Master of Animals on the Gebel el-Arak Knife, dated to the Naqada II period circa 3300-3200 BC, Abydos, Egypt. Louvre Museum, reference E 11517. This work of art both shows the influence of Mesopotamia on Egypt at an early date, and the state of Mesopotamian royal iconography during the Uruk period.

The Amratian culture is named after the site of El-Amrah, about 120 kilometres (75 mi) south of Badari. El-Amreh was the first site where this culture was found unmingled with the later Gerzeh culture. However, this period is better attested at Nagada, and so is also referred to as the "Naqada I" culture. Black-topped ware continued to be produced, but white cross-line ware, a type of pottery decorated with close parallel white lines crossed by another set of close parallel white lines, began to be produced during this time. The Amratian period falls between S.D. 30 and 39. Newly excavated objects indicate that trade between Upper and Lower Egypt existed at this time. A stone vase from the north was found at el-Amreh, and copper, which is not present in Egypt, was apparently imported from the Sinai Peninsula or perhaps Nubia. Obsidian and an extremely small amount of gold were both definitively imported from Nubia during this time. Trade with the oases was also likely.

==== Naqada II ====
The Gerzeh culture ("Naqada II"), named after the site of el-Gerzeh, was the next stage in cultural development, and it was during this time that the foundation for ancient Egypt was laid. The Gerzeh culture was largely an unbroken development out of the Amratian, starting in the Nile Delta and moving south through Upper Egypt; however, it failed to dislodge the Amratian in Nubia. The Gerzeh culture coincided with a significant drop in rainfall and farming produced the vast majority of food. With increased food supplies, the populace adopted a much more sedentary lifestyle, and the larger settlements grew to cities of about 5000 residents. It was in this time that the city dwellers started using adobe to build their cities. Copper instead of stone was increasingly used to make tools and weaponry. Silver, gold, lapis lazuli (imported from Badakhshan in what is now Afghanistan), and Egyptian faience were used ornamentally, and the cosmetic palettes used for eye paint since the Badari culture began to be adorned with reliefs.

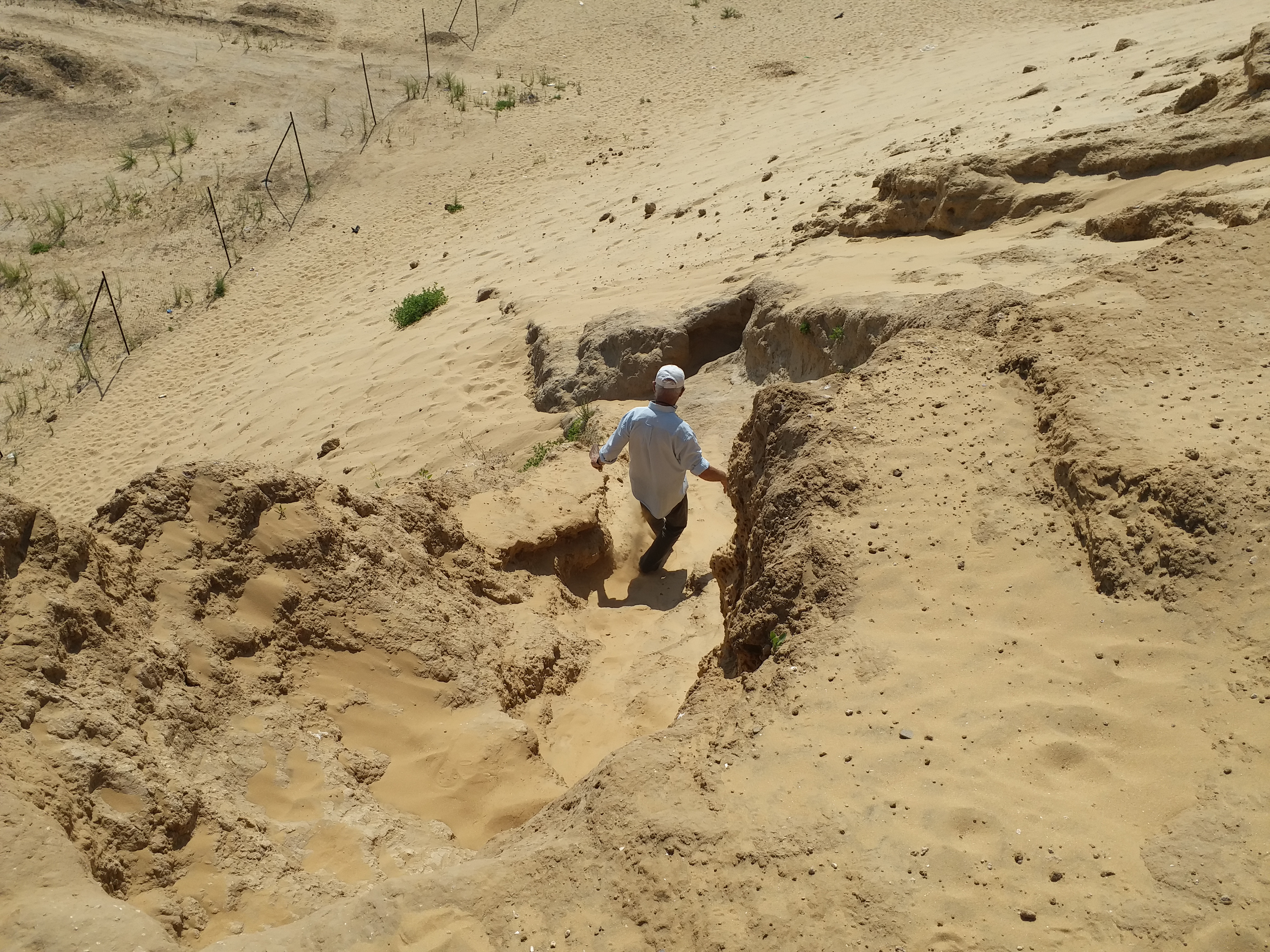
Tell es-Sakan in modern-day Palestine was an Egyptian colony from 3300 t0 300 BC.

By the 33rd century BC, just before the First Dynasty of Egypt, Egypt was divided into two kingdoms known from later times as Upper Egypt to the south and Lower Egypt to the north. The dividing line was drawn roughly in the area of modern Cairo.

During the Protodynastic period, Egypt had a colonial presence in the southern Levant, with the fortified settlement of Tell es-Sakan as an administrative centre.

== Dynastic Egypt ==
=== Early dynastic period ===
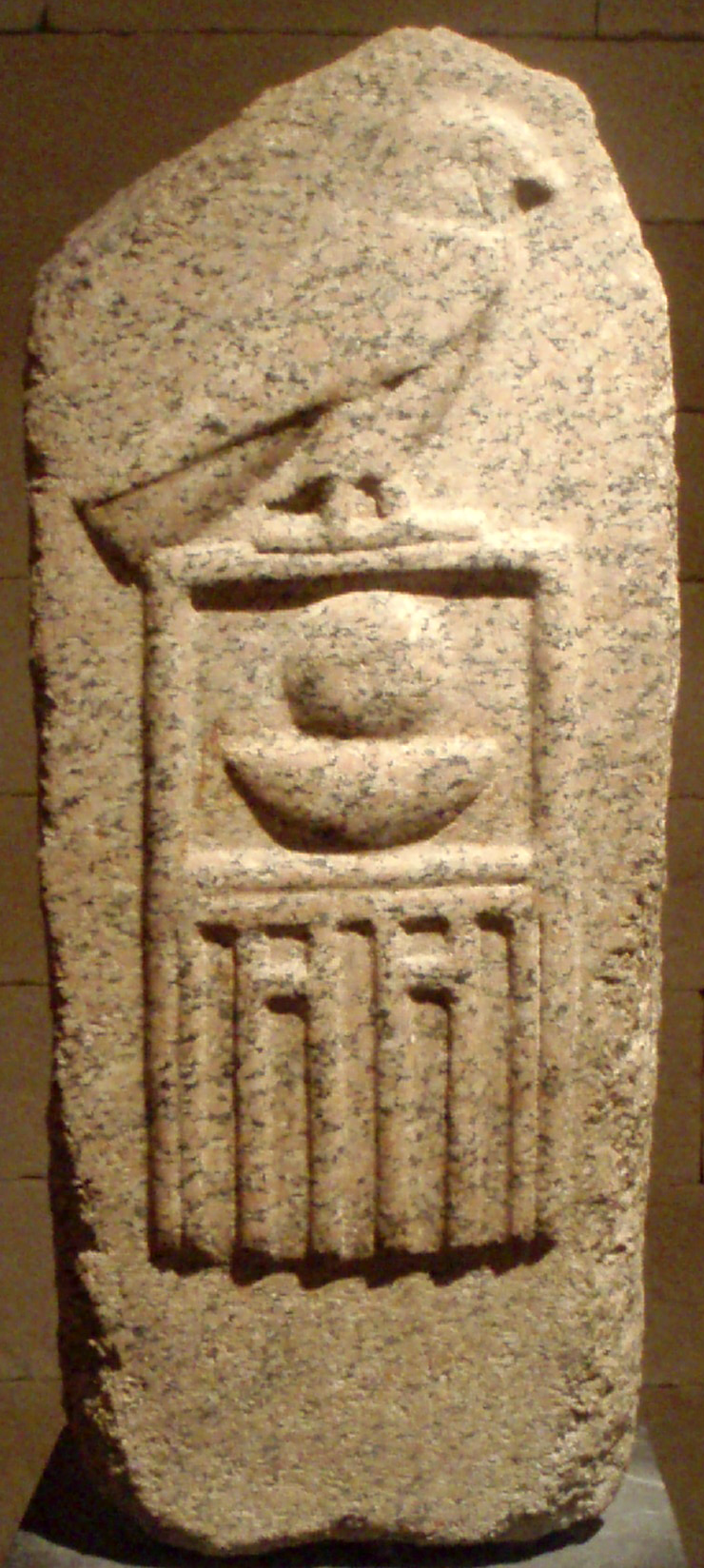
Stela of King Raneb (Pharaoh Nebra) of the Second Dynasty, with his Horus name framed by the royal serekh, and surmounted by the Horus falcon. Displayed at the Metropolitan Museum of Art.

The historical records of ancient Egypt begin with Egypt as a unified state; this occurred sometime around 3150 BC. According to Egyptian tradition, Menes, the first king of ancient Egypt, is thought to have been the unifier of Upper Egypt and Lower Egypt. From this would come an Egyptian culture, set of customs, architecture, idea of artistic expression, and social structure, all closely tied to religion, which would be remarkably stable and change little over a period of nearly 3000 years.

Egyptian chronology, which involves regnal years, began around this time. The conventional chronology was accepted during the twentieth century, but it does not include any of the major revision proposals that also have been made in that time. Even within a single work, archaeologists often offer several possible dates, or even several whole chronologies as possibilities. Consequently, there may be discrepancies between dates shown here and in articles on particular rulers or topics related to ancient Egypt. There also are several possible spellings of the names. Typically, Egyptologists divide the history of pharaonic civilization using a schedule laid out first by Manetho's Aegyptiaca, which was written during the Ptolemaic Kingdom in the third century BC.

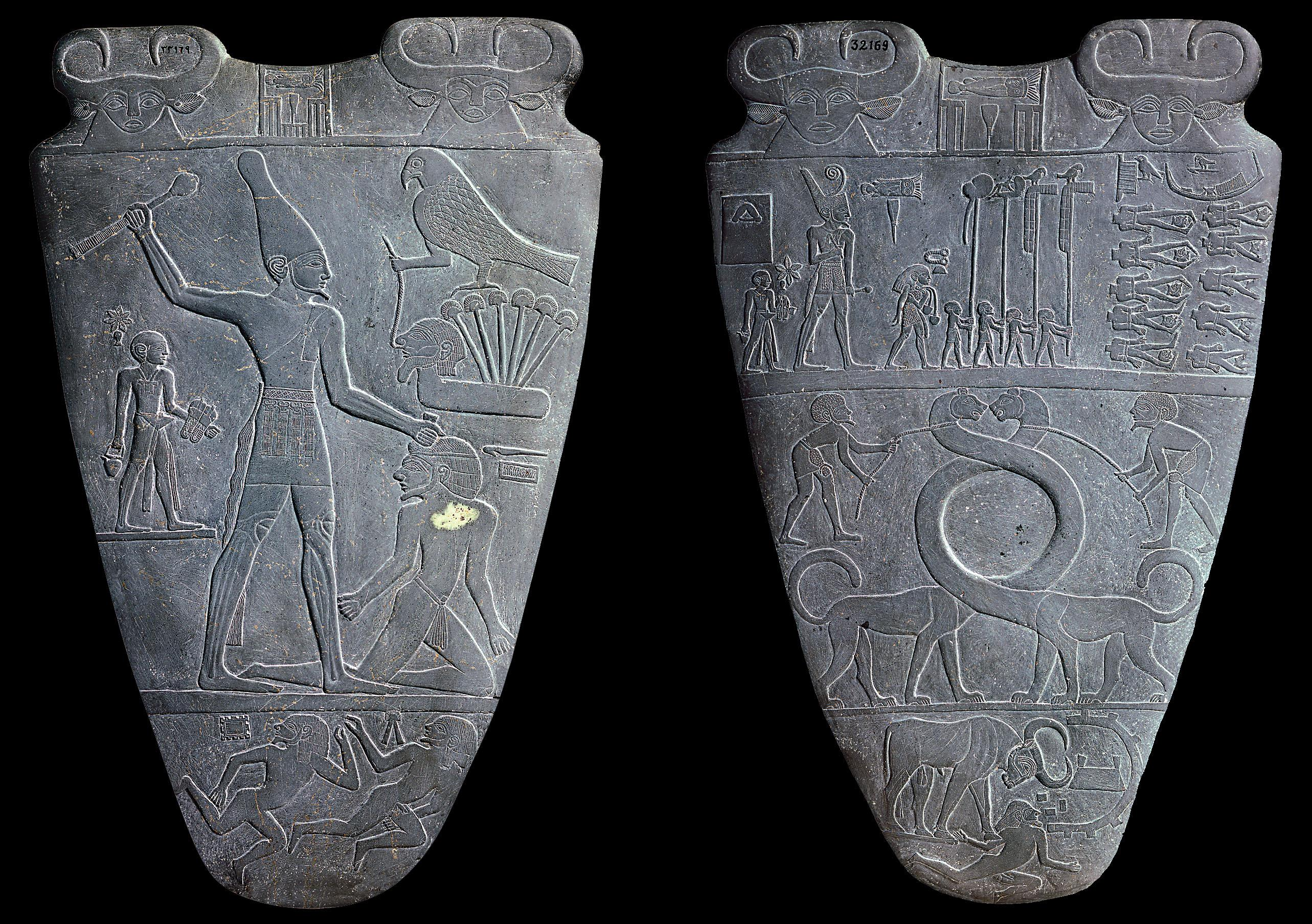
The Narmer Palette depicts the unification of the Two Lands.

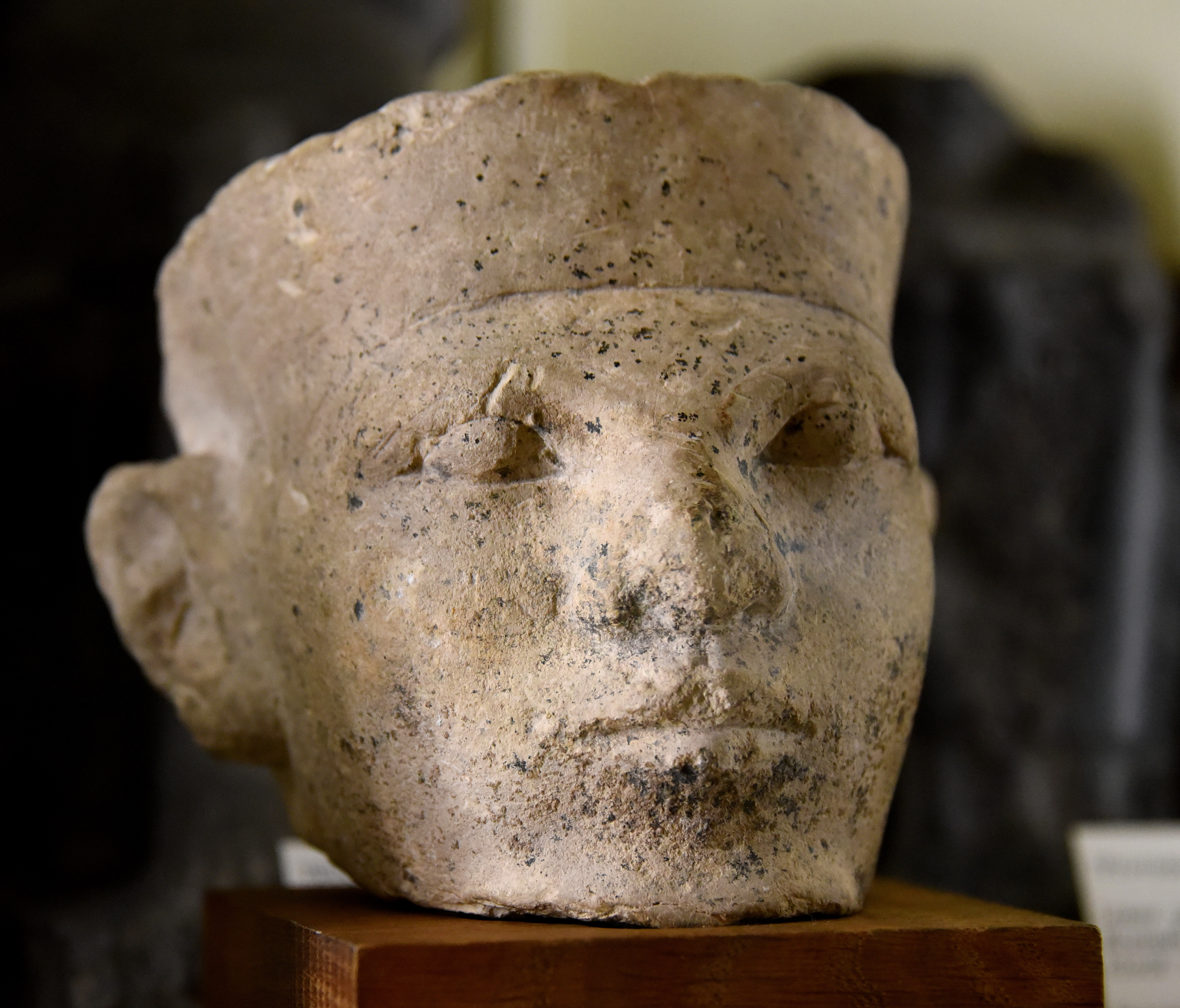
Limestone head of an early Egyptian king, The Petrie Museum. Modern Egyptologists have considered the stone bust to depict an Early Dynastic or Old Kingdom pharaoh.

Prior to the unification of Egypt, the land was settled with autonomous villages. With the early dynasties, and for much of Egypt's history thereafter, the country came to be known as the Two Lands. The pharaohs established a national administration and appointed royal governors.

According to Manetho, the first pharaoh was Menes, but archeological findings support the view that the first ruler to claim to have united the two lands was Narmer, the final king of the Naqada III period. His name is known primarily from the famous Narmer Palette, whose scenes have been interpreted as the act of uniting Upper and Lower Egypt. Menes is now thought to be one of the titles of Hor-Aha, the second pharaoh of the First Dynasty.

Funeral practices for the elite resulted in the construction of mastabas, which later became models for subsequent Old Kingdom constructions such as the step pyramid, thought to have originated during the Third Dynasty of Egypt.

=== Old Kingdom ===
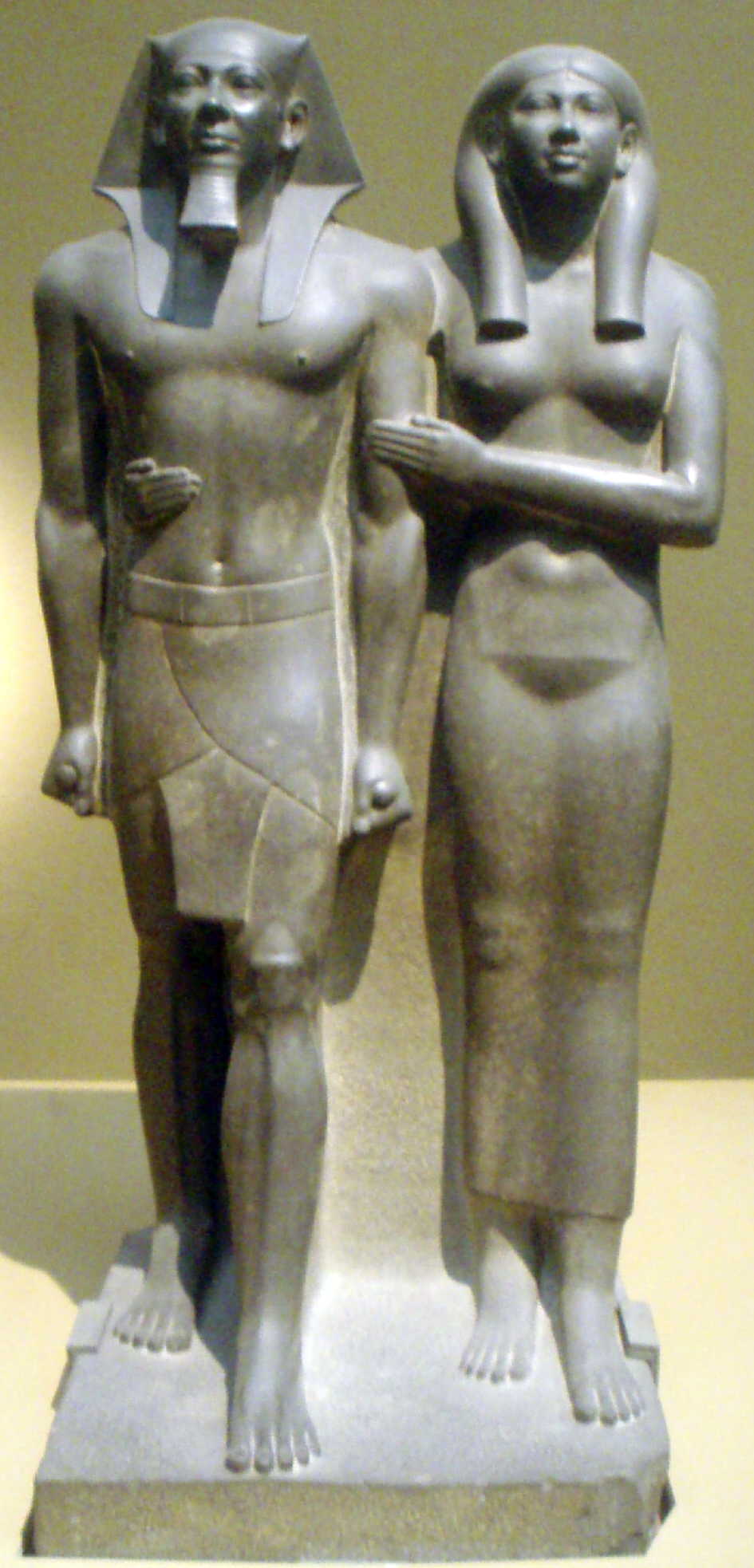
Greywacke statue of the pharaoh Menkaure and his queen consort, Khamerernebty II. Originally from his Giza temple, now on display at the Museum of Fine Arts, Boston.

The Old Kingdom is most commonly regarded as spanning the period of time when Egypt was ruled by the Third Dynasty through to the Sixth Dynasty (2686–2181 BCE). The royal capital of Egypt during this period was located at Memphis, where Djoser (2630–2611 BCE) established his court.

The Old Kingdom is perhaps best known, however, for the large number of pyramids, which were constructed at this time as pharaonic burial places. For this reason, this epoch is frequently referred to as "the Age of the Pyramids". The first notable pharaoh of the Old Kingdom was Djoser of the Third Dynasty, who ordered the construction of the first pyramid, the Pyramid of Djoser, in Memphis' necropolis of Saqqara.

It was in this era that formerly independent states became nomes (districts) ruled solely by the pharaoh. Former local rulers were forced to assume the role of nomarch (governor) or work as tax collectors. Egyptians in this era worshiped the pharaoh as a god, believing that he ensured the annual flooding of the Nile that was necessary for their crops.

The Old Kingdom and its royal power reached their zenith under the Fourth Dynasty. Sneferu, the dynasty's founder, is believed to have commissioned at least three pyramids; while his son and successor Khufu (Greek Cheops) erected the Great Pyramid of Giza, Sneferu had more stone and brick moved than any other pharaoh. Khufu, his son Khafre (Greek Chephren), and his grandson Menkaure (Greek Mycerinus) all achieved lasting fame in the construction of the Giza pyramid complex.

To organize and feed the manpower needed to create these pyramids required a centralized government with extensive powers, and Egyptologists believe the Old Kingdom at this time demonstrated this level of sophistication. Recent excavations near the pyramids led by Mark Lehner have uncovered a large city that seems to have housed, fed and supplied the pyramid workers. Although it was once believed that slaves built these monuments, a theory based on The Exodus narrative of the Hebrew Bible, study of the tombs of the workmen, who oversaw construction on the pyramids, has shown they were built by a corvée of peasants drawn from across Egypt. They apparently worked while the annual flood covered their fields, as well as a very large crew of specialists, including stonecutters, painters, mathematicians and priests.

The Fifth Dynasty began with Userkaf c. 2495 BC and was marked by the growing importance of the cult of the sun god Ra. Consequently, less effort was devoted to the construction of pyramid complexes than during the Fourth Dynasty and more to the construction of sun temples in Abusir. The decoration of pyramid complexes grew more elaborate during the dynasty and its last king, Unas, was the first to have the Pyramid Texts inscribed in his pyramid.

Egypt's expanding interests in trade goods such as ebony, incense such as myrrh and frankincense, gold, copper and other useful metals compelled the ancient Egyptians to navigate the open seas. Evidence from the pyramid of Sahure, second king of the dynasty, shows that a regular trade existed with the Syrian coast to procure cedar wood. Pharaohs also launched expeditions to the famed Land of Punt, possibly the Horn of Africa, for ebony, ivory and aromatic resins.

During the Sixth Dynasty (2345–2181 BCE), the power of pharaohs gradually weakened in favor of powerful nomarchs. These no longer belonged to the royal family and their charge became hereditary, thus creating local dynasties largely independent from the central authority of the pharaoh. Internal disorders set in during the incredibly long reign of Pepi II Neferkare (2278–2184 BCE) towards the end of the dynasty. His death, certainly well past that of his intended heirs, might have created succession struggles and the country slipped into civil wars mere decades after the close of Pepi II's reign. The final blow came when the 4.2 kiloyear event struck the region in the 22nd century BC, producing consistently low Nile flood levels. The result was the collapse of the Old Kingdom followed by decades of famine and strife.

=== First Intermediate Period ===
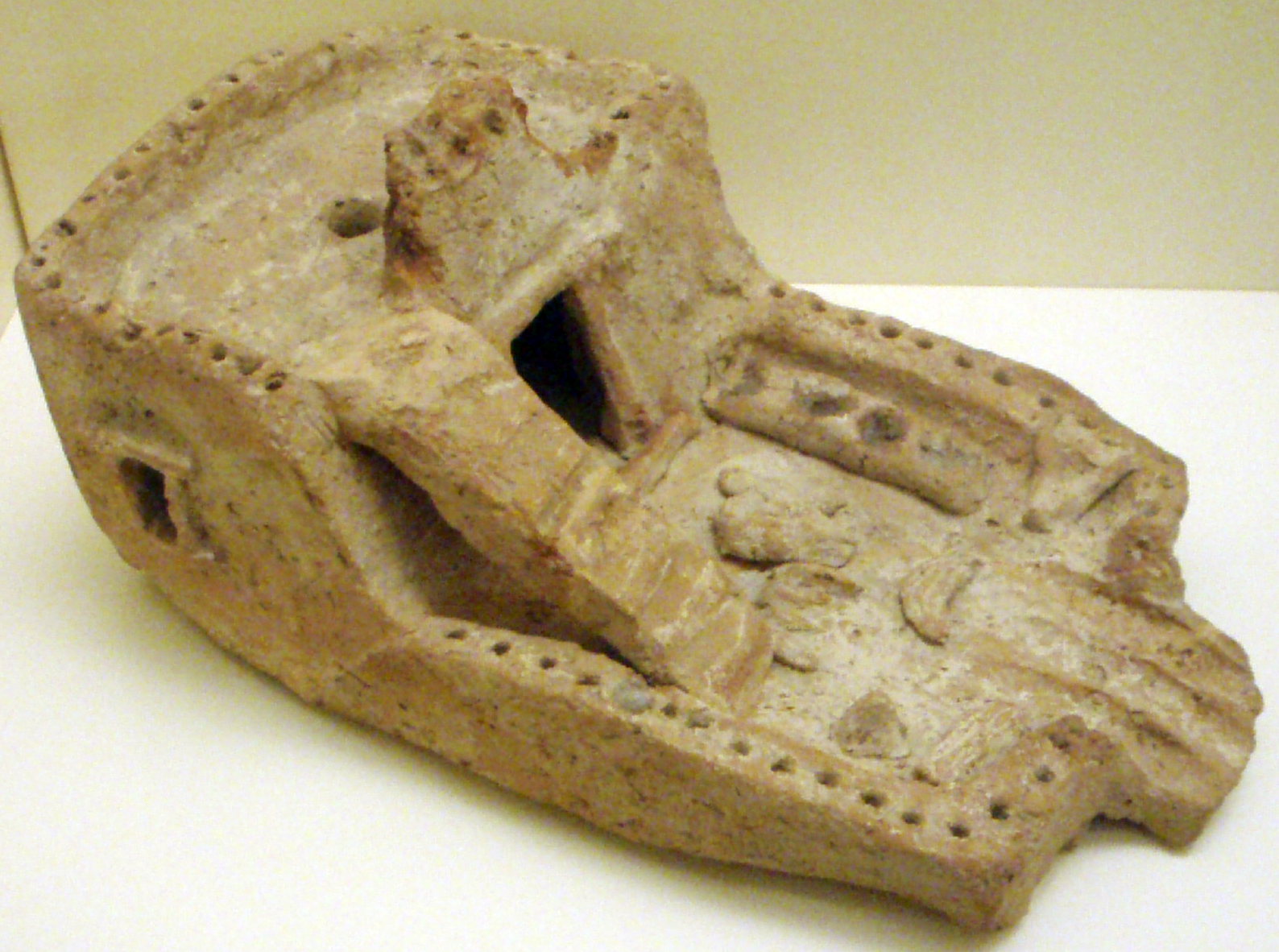
Pottery model of a house used in a burial from the First Intermediate Period, on display at the Royal Ontario Museum.

After the fall of the Old Kingdom came a roughly 200-year stretch of time known as the First Intermediate Period, which is generally thought to include a relatively obscure set of pharaohs running from the end of the Sixth to the Tenth and most of the Eleventh Dynasties. Most of these were likely local monarchs who did not hold much power outside of their nome. There are a number of texts known as "Lamentations" from the early period of the subsequent Middle Kingdom that may shed some light on what happened during this period. Some of these texts reflect on the breakdown of rule, others allude to invasion by "Asiatic bowmen". In general, the stories focus on a society where the natural order of things in both society and nature was overthrown.

It is also highly likely that it was during this period that all of the pyramid and tomb complexes were looted. Further lamentation texts allude to this fact, and by the beginning of the Middle Kingdom mummies are found decorated with magical spells that were once exclusive to the pyramid of the kings of the Sixth Dynasty.

By 2160 BC, a new line of pharaohs, the Ninth and Tenth Dynasties, consolidated Lower Egypt from their capital in Heracleopolis Magna. A rival line, the Eleventh Dynasty based at Thebes, reunited Upper Egypt, and a clash between the rival dynasties was inevitable. Around 2055 BC, the Theban forces defeated the Heracleopolitan pharaohs and reunited the Two Lands. The reign of its first pharaoh, Mentuhotep II, marks the beginning of the Middle Kingdom.

=== Middle Kingdom ===
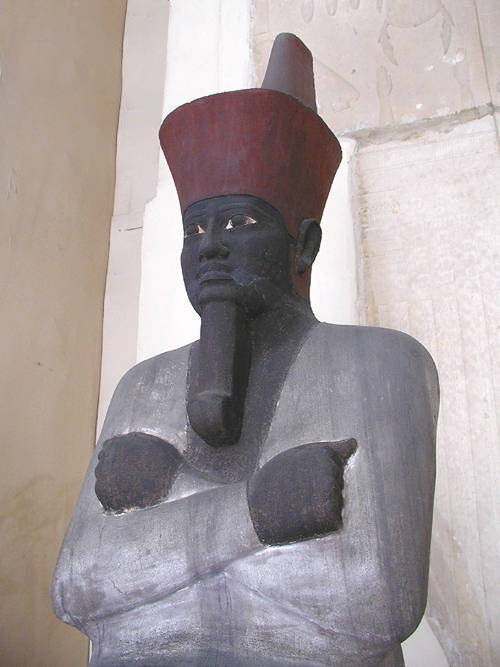
An Osiris statue of Mentuhotep II, the founder of the Middle Kingdom

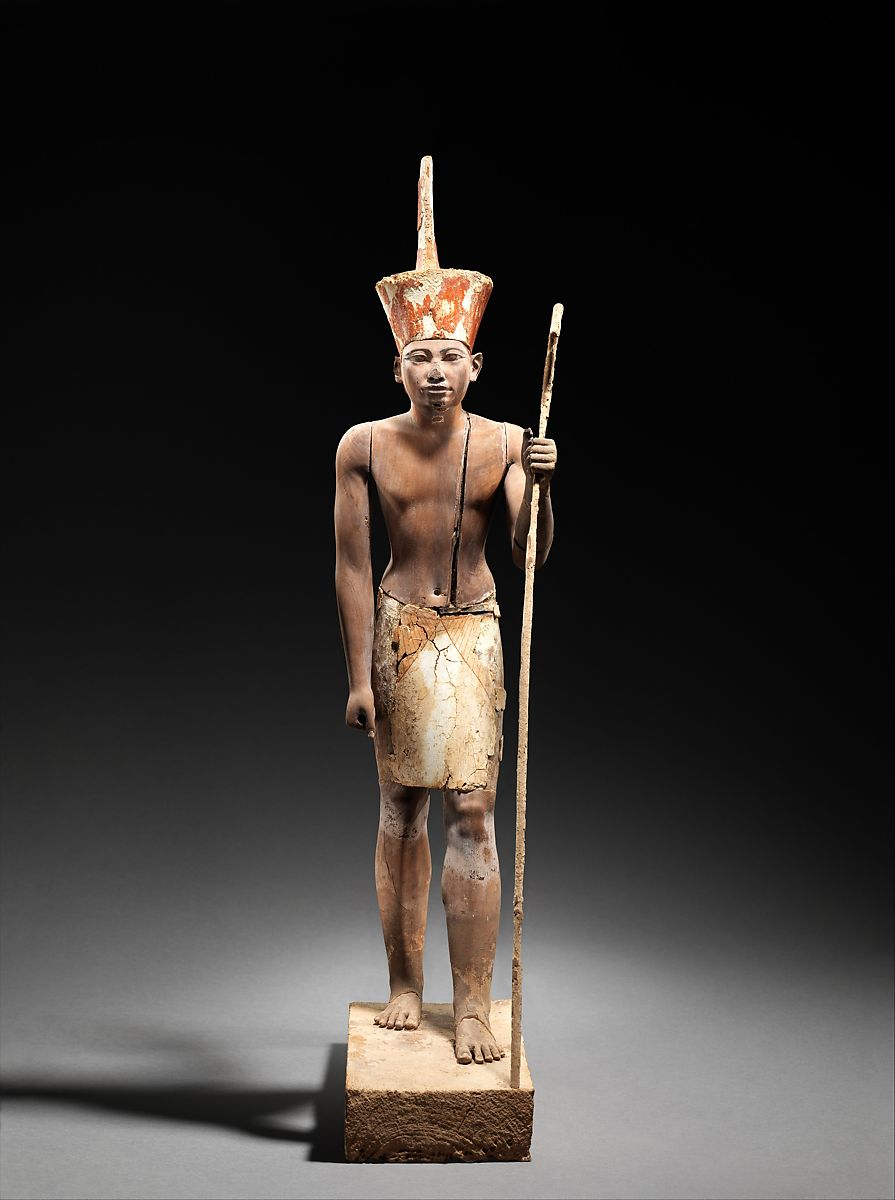
A guardian statue which reflects the facial features of the reigning king, probably Amenemhat II or Senwosret II, and which functioned as a divine guardian for the imiut. Made of cedar wood and plaster c. 1919–1885 BC

The Middle Kingdom is the period in the history of ancient Egypt stretching from the 39th regnal year of Mentuhotep II of the Eleventh Dynasty to the end of the Thirteenth Dynasty, roughly between 2030 and 1650 BC. The period comprises two phases, the Eleventh Dynasty, which ruled from Thebes, and then the Twelfth Dynasty, whose capital was Lisht. These two dynasties were originally considered the full extent of this unified kingdom, but some historians now consider the first part of the Thirteenth Dynasty to belong to the Middle Kingdom.

The earliest pharaohs of the Middle Kingdom traced their origin to two nomarchs of Thebes, Intef the Elder, who served a Heracleopolitan pharaoh of the Tenth Dynasty, and his successor, Mentuhotep I. The successor of the latter, Intef I, was the first Theban nomarch to claim a Horus name and thus the throne of Egypt. He is considered the first pharaoh of the Eleventh Dynasty. His claims brought the Thebans into conflict with the rulers of the Tenth Dynasty. Intef I and his brother Intef II undertook several campaigns northwards and finally captured the important nome of Abydos. Warfare continued intermittently between the Thebean and Heracleapolitan dynasties until the 39th regnal year of Mentuhotep II, second successor of Intef II. At this point, the Herakleopolitans were defeated and the Theban dynasty consolidated their rule over Egypt. Mentuhotep II is known to have commanded military campaigns south into Nubia, which had gained its independence during the First Intermediate Period. There is also evidence for military actions against the Southern Levant. The king reorganized the country and placed a vizier at the head of civil administration for the country. Mentuhotep II was succeeded by his son, Mentuhotep III, who organized an expedition to Punt. His reign saw the realization of some of the finest Egyptian carvings. Mentuhotep III was succeeded by Mentuhotep IV, the final pharaoh of this dynasty. Despite being absent from various lists of pharaohs, his reign is attested from a few inscriptions in Wadi Hammamat that record expeditions to the Red Sea coast and to quarry stone for the royal monuments.

The leader of this expedition was his vizier Amenemhat, who is widely assumed to be the future Pharaoh Amenemhat I, the first pharaoh of the Twelfth Dynasty. Amenemhat is therefore assumed by some Egyptologists to have either usurped the throne or assumed power after Mentuhotep IV died childless. Amenemhat I built a new capital for Egypt, Itjtawy, thought to be located near the present-day Lisht, although Manetho claims the capital remained at Thebes. Amenemhat forcibly pacified internal unrest, curtailed the rights of the nomarchs, and is known to have launched at least one campaign into Nubia. His son Senusret I continued the policy of his father to recapture Nubia and other territories lost during the First Intermediate Period. The Libu were subdued under his forty-five year reign and Egypt's prosperity and security were secured. Senusret III (1878–1839 BC) was a warrior king, leading his troops deep into Nubia, and built a series of massive forts throughout the country to establish Egypt's formal boundaries with the unconquered areas of its territory. Amenemhat III (1860–1815 BC) is considered the last great pharaoh of the Middle Kingdom.

Egypt's population began to exceed food production levels during the reign of Amenemhat III, who then ordered the exploitation of the Faiyum and increased mining operations in the Sinai Peninsula. He also invited settlers from Western Asia to Egypt to labor on Egypt's monuments. Late in his reign, the annual flooding of the Nile began to fail, further straining the resources of the government. The Thirteenth Dynasty and Fourteenth Dynasty witnessed the slow decline of Egypt into the Second Intermediate Period, in which some of the settlers invited by Amenemhat III would seize power as the Hyksos.

=== Second Intermediate Period and the Hyksos ===
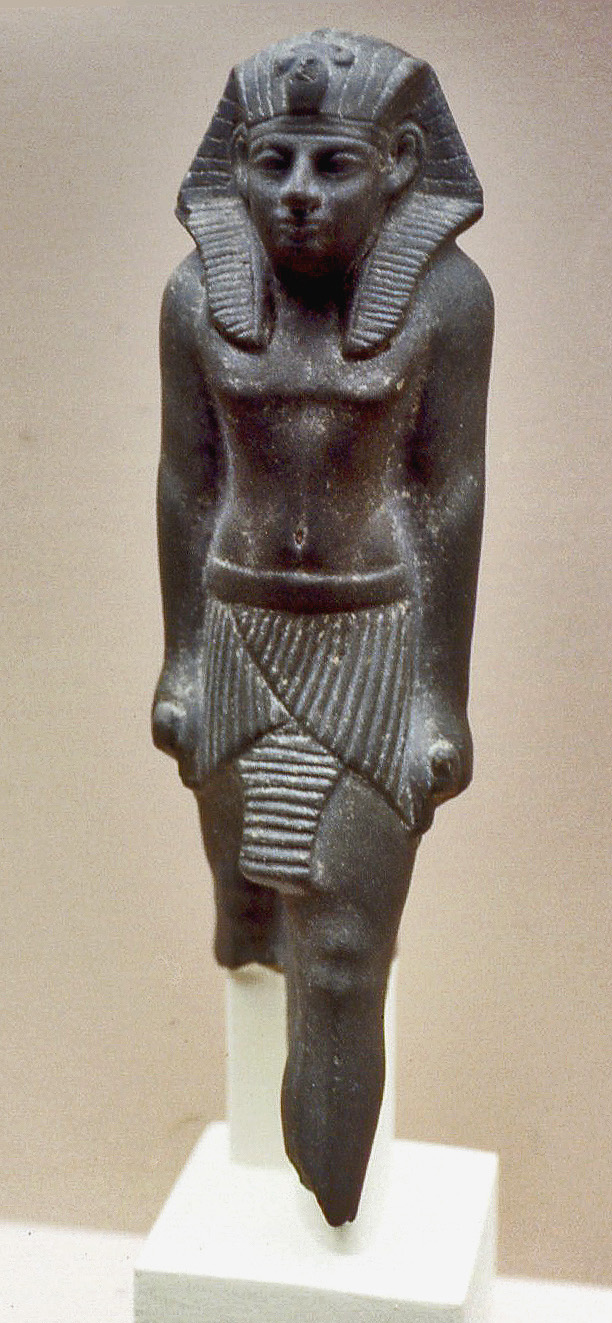
Statuette of Merankhre Mentuhotep, a minor pharaoh of the Sixteenth Dynasty, reigning over the Theban region c. 1585 BC.

The Second Intermediate Period marks a period when Egypt once again fell into disarray between the end of the Middle Kingdom and the start of the New Kingdom. This period is best known as the time the Hyksos made their appearance in Egypt, the reigns of its kings comprising the Fifteenth Dynasty.

The Thirteenth Dynasty proved unable to hold onto the long land of Egypt, and a provincial family of Levantine descent located in the marshes of the eastern Delta at Avaris broke away from the central authority to form the Fourteenth Dynasty. The splintering of the land most likely happened shortly after the reigns of the powerful Thirteenth Dynasty Pharaohs Neferhotep I and Sobekhotep IV c. 1720 BC.

While the Fourteenth Dynasty was Levantine, the Hyksos first appeared in Egypt c. 1650 BC when they took control of Avaris and rapidly moved south to Memphis, thereby ending the Thirteenth and Fourteenth Dynasties. The outlines of the traditional account of the "invasion" of the land by the Hyksos is preserved in the Aegyptiaca of Manetho, who records that during this time the Hyksos overran Egypt, led by Salitis, the founder of the Fifteenth Dynasty. More recently, however, the idea of a simple migration, with little or no violence involved, has gained some support. Under this theory, the Egyptian rulers of the Thirteenth and Fourteenth dynasties were unable to stop these new migrants from traveling to Egypt from the Levant because their kingdoms were struggling to cope with various domestic problems, including possibly famine and plague. Be it military or peaceful, the weakened state of the Thirteenth and Fourteenth Dynasty kingdoms could explain why they rapidly fell to the emerging Hyksos power.

The Hyksos princes and chieftains ruled in the eastern Delta with their local Egyptian vassals. The Fifteenth Dynasty rulers established their capital and seat of government at Memphis and their summer residence at Avaris. The Hyksos kingdom was centered in the eastern Nile Delta and central Egypt but relentlessly pushed south for the control of central and Upper Egypt. Around the time Memphis fell to the Hyksos, the native Egyptian ruling house in Thebes declared its independence and set itself up as the Sixteenth Dynasty. Another short lived dynasty might have done the same in central Egypt, profiting from the power vacuum created by the fall of the Thirteenth Dynasty and forming the Abydos Dynasty. By 1600 BC, the Hyksos had successfully moved south in central Egypt, eliminating the Abydos Dynasty and directly threatening the Sixteenth Dynasty. The latter was to prove unable to resist and Thebes fell to the Hyksos for a very short period c. 1580 BC. The Hyksos rapidly withdrew to the north and Thebes regained some independence under the Seventeenth Dynasty. From then on, Hyksos relations with the south seem to have been mainly of a commercial nature, although Theban princes appear to have recognized the Hyksos rulers and may possibly have provided them with tribute for a period.

The Seventeenth Dynasty was to prove the salvation of Egypt and would eventually lead the war of liberation that drove the Hyksos back into Asia. The two last kings of this dynasty were Seqenenre Tao and Kamose. Ahmose I completed the conquest and expulsion of the Hyksos from the Nile Delta, restored Theban rule over the whole of Egypt and successfully reasserted Egyptian power in its formerly subject territories of Nubia and the Southern Levant. His reign marks the beginning of the Eighteenth Dynasty and the New Kingdom.

=== New Kingdom ===
Possibly as a result of the foreign rule of the Hyksos during the Second Intermediate Period, the New Kingdom saw Egypt attempt to create a buffer between the Levant and Egypt, and attain its greatest territorial extent. It expanded far south into Nubia and held wide territories in the Near East. Egyptian armies fought Hittite armies for control of modern-day Syria.

==== Eighteenth Dynasty ====
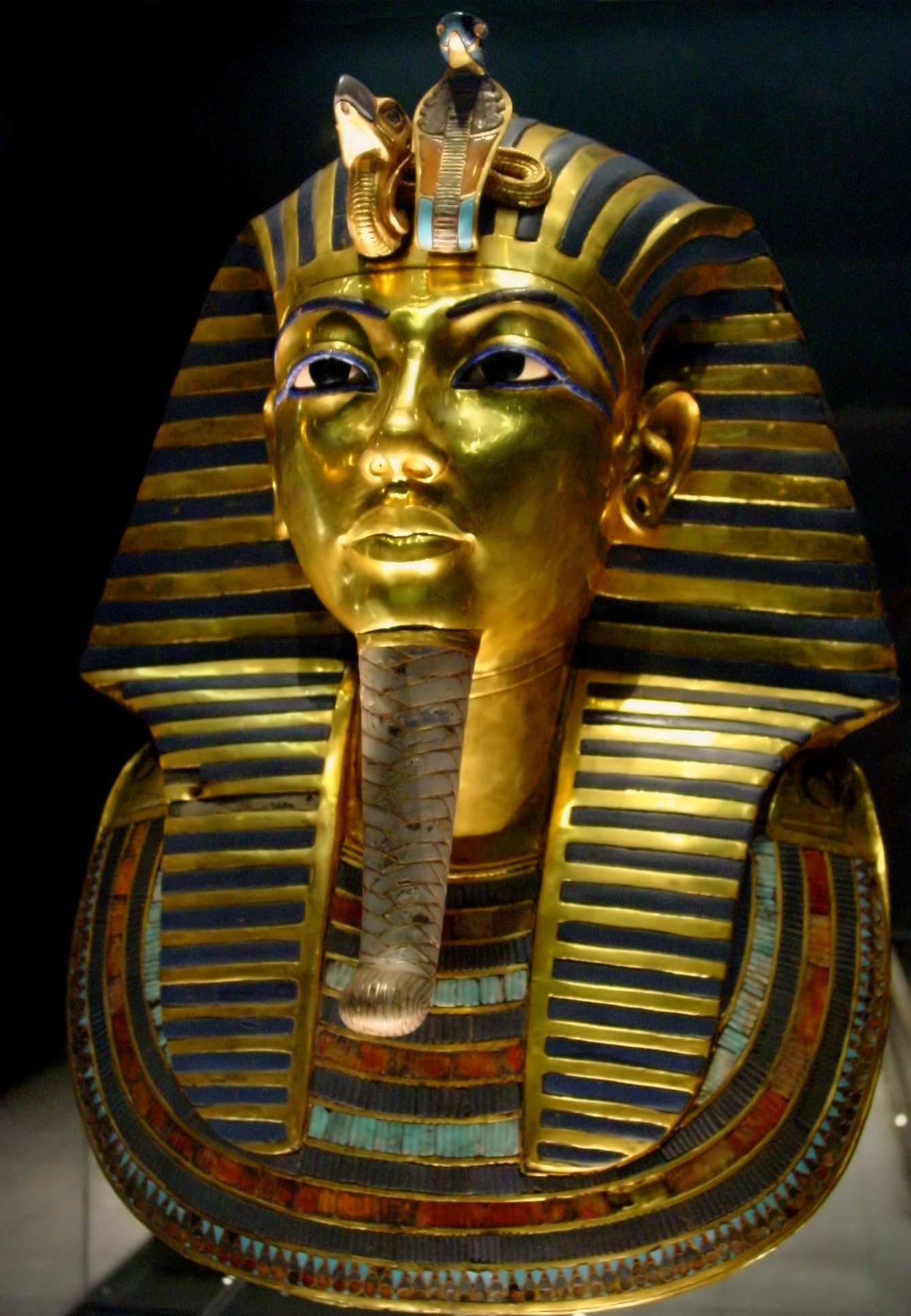
Golden mask from the mummy of Tutankhamun

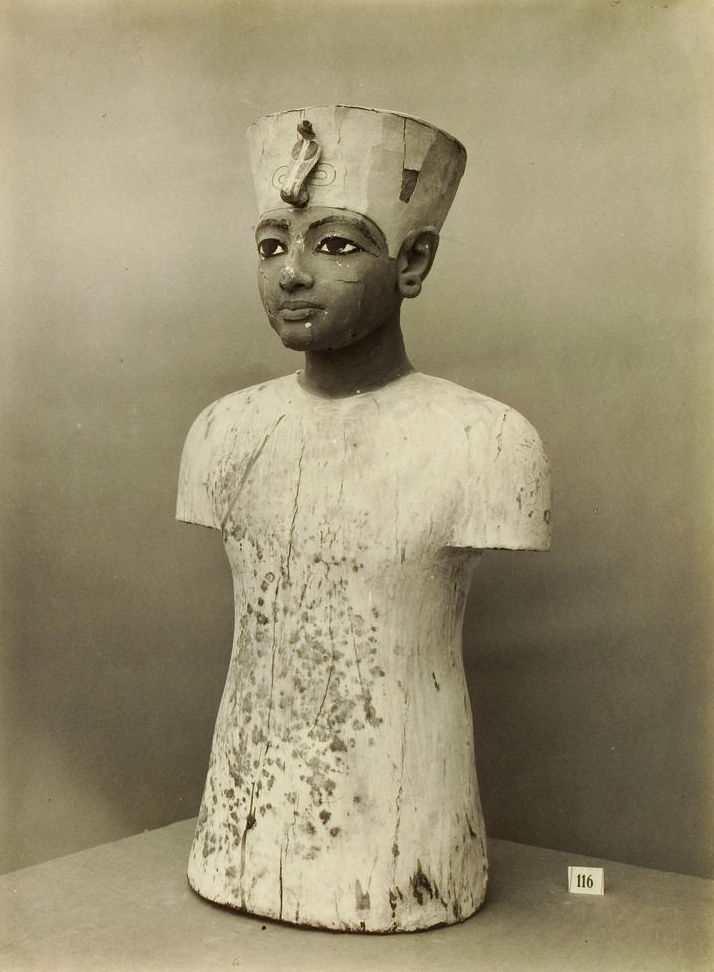
A painted, wooden figure of Tutankhamun found in his royal tomb

This was a time of great wealth and power for Egypt. Some of the most important and best-known pharaohs ruled at this time, such as Hatshepsut. Hatshepsut is unusual as she was a female pharaoh, a rare occurrence in Egyptian history. She was an ambitious and competent leader, extending Egyptian trade south into present-day Somalia and north into the Mediterranean. She ruled for twenty years through a combination of widespread propaganda and deft political skill. Her co-regent and successor Thutmose III ("the Napoleon of Egypt") expanded Egypt's army and wielded it with great success. However, late in his reign, he ordered her name hacked out from her monuments. He fought against Asiatic people and was the most successful of Egyptian pharaohs. Amenhotep III built extensively at the temple of Karnak including the Luxor Temple, which consisted of two pylons, a colonnade behind the new temple entrance, and a new temple to the goddess Maat.

During the reign of Thutmose III (c. 1479–1425 BC), pharaoh, originally referring to the king's palace, became a form of address for the person who was king.

One of the best-known 18th Dynasty pharaohs is Amenhotep IV, who changed his name to Akhenaten in honor of the god Aten. His exclusive worship of the Aten, sometimes called Atenism, is often seen as history's first instance of monotheism. Atenism and several changes that accompanied it seriously disrupted Egyptian society. Akhenaten built a new capital at the site of Amarna, which gives his reign and the few that followed their modern name, the Amarna Period. Amarna art diverged significantly from the previous conventions of Egyptian art. Under a series of successors, of whom the longest reigning were Tutankhamun and Horemheb, worship of the old gods was revived and much of the art and monuments that were created during Akhenaten's reign was defaced or destroyed. When Horemheb died without an heir, he named as his successor Ramesses I, founder of the Nineteenth Dynasty.

==== Nineteenth Dynasty ====
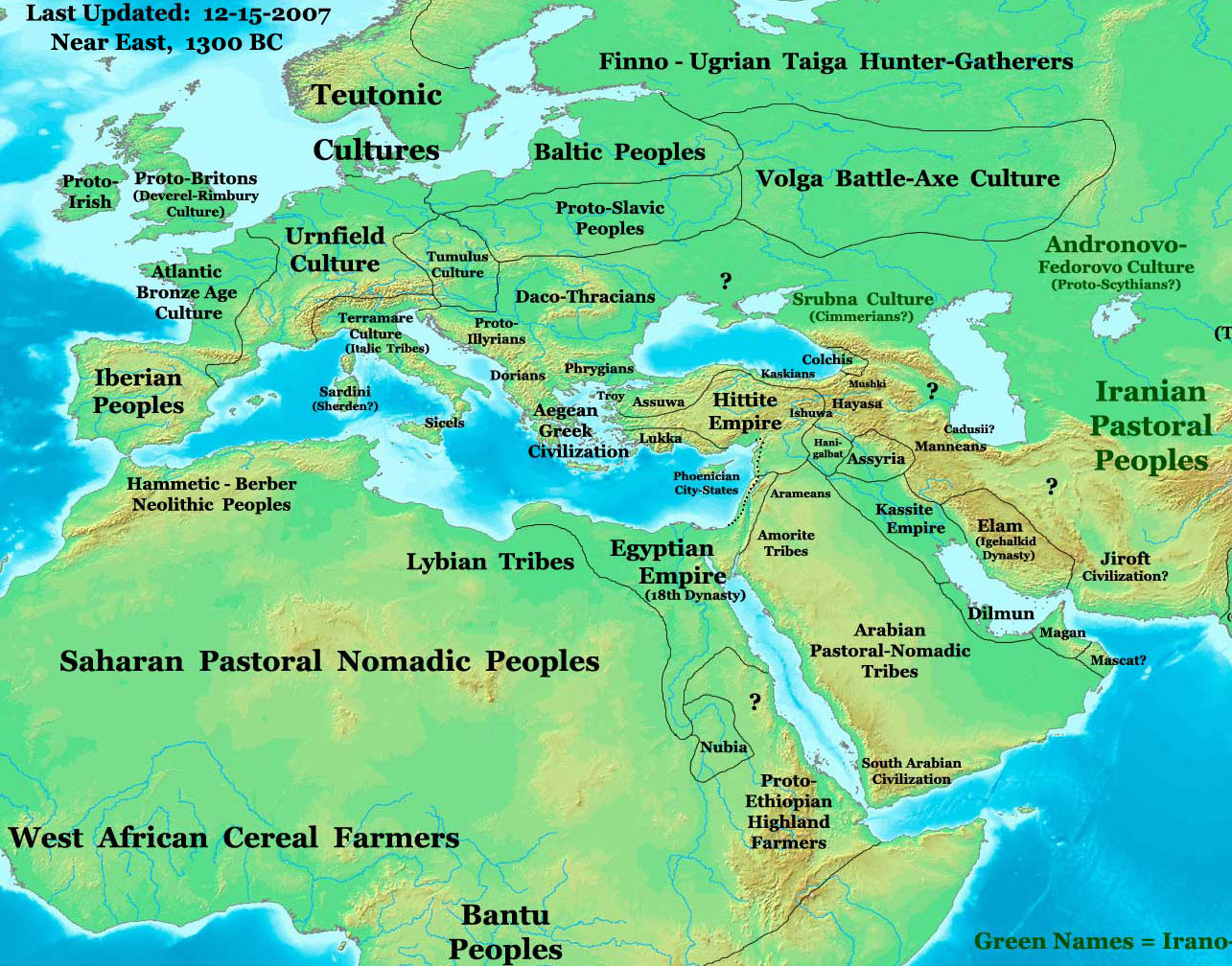
Egypt and its world in 1300 BC.

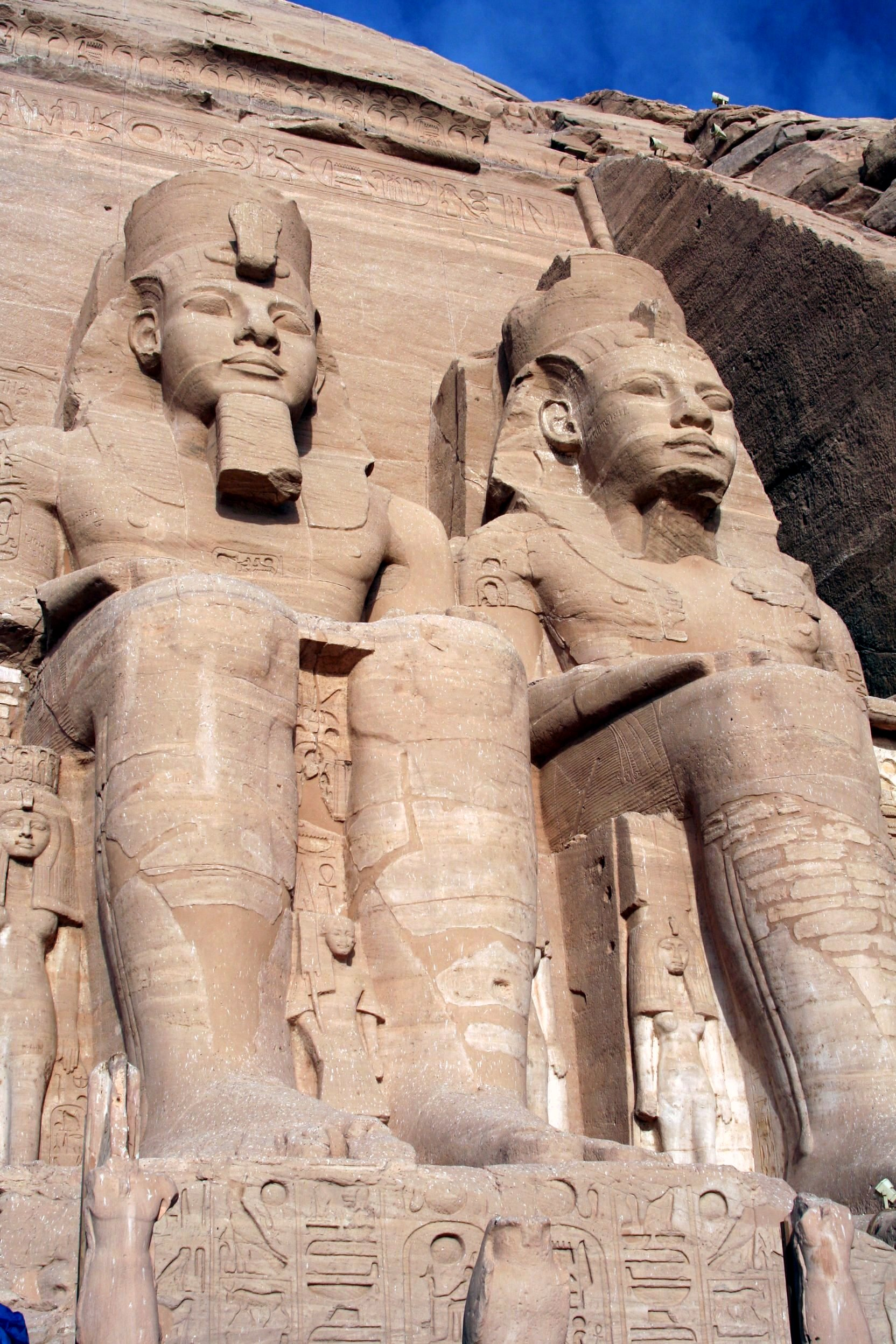
Colossal depictions of Ramesses II at one of the Abu Simbel temples.

Ramesses I reigned for two years and was succeeded by his son Seti I. Seti I carried on the work of Horemheb in restoring power, control, and respect to Egypt. He also was responsible for creating the temple complex at Abydos.

Arguably Ancient Egypt's power as a nation-state peaked during the reign of Ramesses II ("the Great") of the Nineteenth Dynasty. He reigned for 67 years from the age of 18 and carried on his father Seti I's work and created many more splendid temples, such as that of Abu Simbel temples on the Nubian border. He sought to recover territories in the Levant that had been held by the Eighteenth Dynasty. His campaigns of reconquest culminated in the Battle of Kadesh in 1274 BC, where he led Egyptian armies against those of the Hittite king Muwatalli II and was caught in history's first recorded military ambush.

Ramesses II was famed for the huge number of children he sired by his various wives and concubines; the tomb he built for his sons (many of whom he outlived) in the Valley of the Kings has proven to be the largest funerary complex in Egypt.

His immediate successors continued the military campaigns, though an increasingly troubled court complicated matters. Ramesses II was succeeded by his son Merneptah and then by Merneptah's son Seti II. Seti II's throne seems to have been disputed by his half-brother Amenmesse, who may have temporarily ruled from Thebes.

Upon his death, Seti II's son Siptah, who may have been afflicted with poliomyelitis during his life, was appointed to the throne by Chancellor Bay, a West Asian commoner who served as vizier behind the scenes. At Siptah's early death, the throne was assumed by Twosret, the queen dowager of Seti II and possibly Amenmesse's sister.

A period of anarchy at the end of Twosret's short reign saw a native reaction to foreign control leading to the execution of Bay and the enthronement of Setnakhte, establishing the Twentieth Dynasty.

==== Twentieth Dynasty ====
The last "great" pharaoh from the New Kingdom is widely considered Ramesses III, the son of Setnakhte who reigned three decades after the time of Ramesses II (c.1279–1213 BC). In Year 8 of his reign, the Sea People invaded Egypt by land and sea. Ramesses III defeated them in two great land and sea battles. He claimed that he incorporated them as subject people and settled them in Southern Canaan, although there is evidence that they forced their way into Canaan. Their presence in Canaan may have contributed to the formation of new states in this region such as Philistia after the collapse of the Egyptian Empire. He was also compelled to fight invading Libyan tribesmen in two major campaigns in Egypt's Western Delta in his Year 6 and Year 11 respectively.

The heavy cost of these battles slowly exhausted Egypt's treasury and contributed to the gradual decline of the Egyptian Empire in Asia. The severity of these difficulties is stressed by the fact that the first known strike action in recorded history occurred during Year 29 of Ramesses III's reign, when the food rations for the Egypt's favoured and elite royal tomb-builders and artisans in the village of Deir el-Medina could not be provisioned. Something in the air prevented much sunlight from reaching the ground and also arrested global tree growth for almost two full decades until 1140 BC. One proposed cause is the Hekla 3 eruption in Iceland, but the dating of that event remains in dispute.

Following Ramesses III's death, there was endless bickering between his heirs. Three of his sons would go on to assume power as Ramesses IV, Ramesses VI and Ramesses VIII, respectively. However, at this time Egypt was also increasingly beset by a series of droughts, below-normal flooding levels of the Nile, famine, civil unrest and official corruption. The power of the last pharaoh, Ramesses XI, grew so weak that in the south the Theban High Priests of Amun became the effective de facto rulers of Upper Egypt, while Smendes controlled Lower Egypt even before Ramesses XI's death. Smendes would eventually found the Twenty-first Dynasty at Tanis.

=== Third Intermediate Period ===
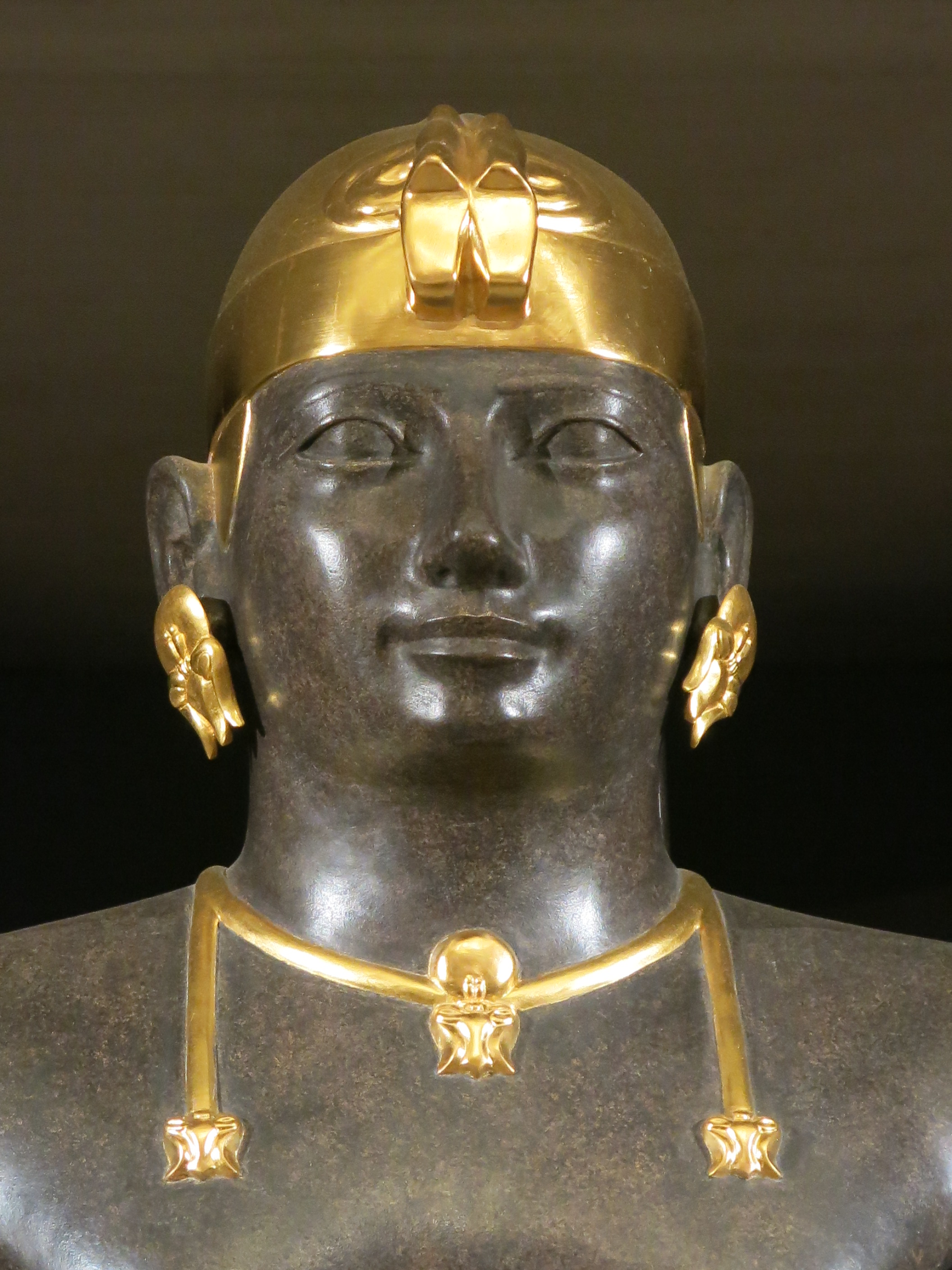
Portrait of "Black Pharaoh" Taharqa, Louvre Museum reconstruction

After the death of Ramesses XI, his successor Smendes ruled from the city of Tanis in the north, while the High Priests of Amun at Thebes had effective rule of the south of the country, whilst still nominally recognizing Smendes as king. In fact, this division was less significant than it seems, since both priests and pharaohs came from the same family. Piankh, assumed control of Upper Egypt, ruling from Thebes, with the northern limit of his control ending at Al-Hibah. (The High Priest Herihor had died before Ramesses XI, but also was an all-but-independent ruler in the latter days of the king's reign.) The country was once again split into two parts with the priests in Thebes and the pharaohs at Tanis. Their reign seems without other distinction, and they were replaced without any apparent struggle by the Libyan kings of the Twenty-Second Dynasty.

Egypt has long had ties with Libya, and the first king of the new dynasty, Shoshenq I, was a Meshwesh Libyan, who served as the commander of the armies under the last ruler of the Twenty-First Dynasty, Psusennes II. He unified the country, putting control of the Amun clergy under his own son as the High Priest of Amun, a post that was previously a hereditary appointment. The scant and patchy nature of the written records from this period suggest that it was unsettled. There appear to have been many subversive groups, which eventually led to the creation of the Twenty-Third Dynasty, which ran concurrent with the latter part of the Twenty-Second Dynasty. The country was reunited by the Twenty-Second Dynasty founded by Shoshenq I in 945 BC (or 943 BC), who descended from Meshwesh immigrants, originally from Ancient Libya. This brought stability to the country for well over a century. After the reign of Osorkon II the country had again splintered into two states with Shoshenq III of the Twenty-Second Dynasty controlling Lower Egypt by 818 BC while Takelot II and his son (the future Osorkon III) ruled Middle and Upper Egypt.

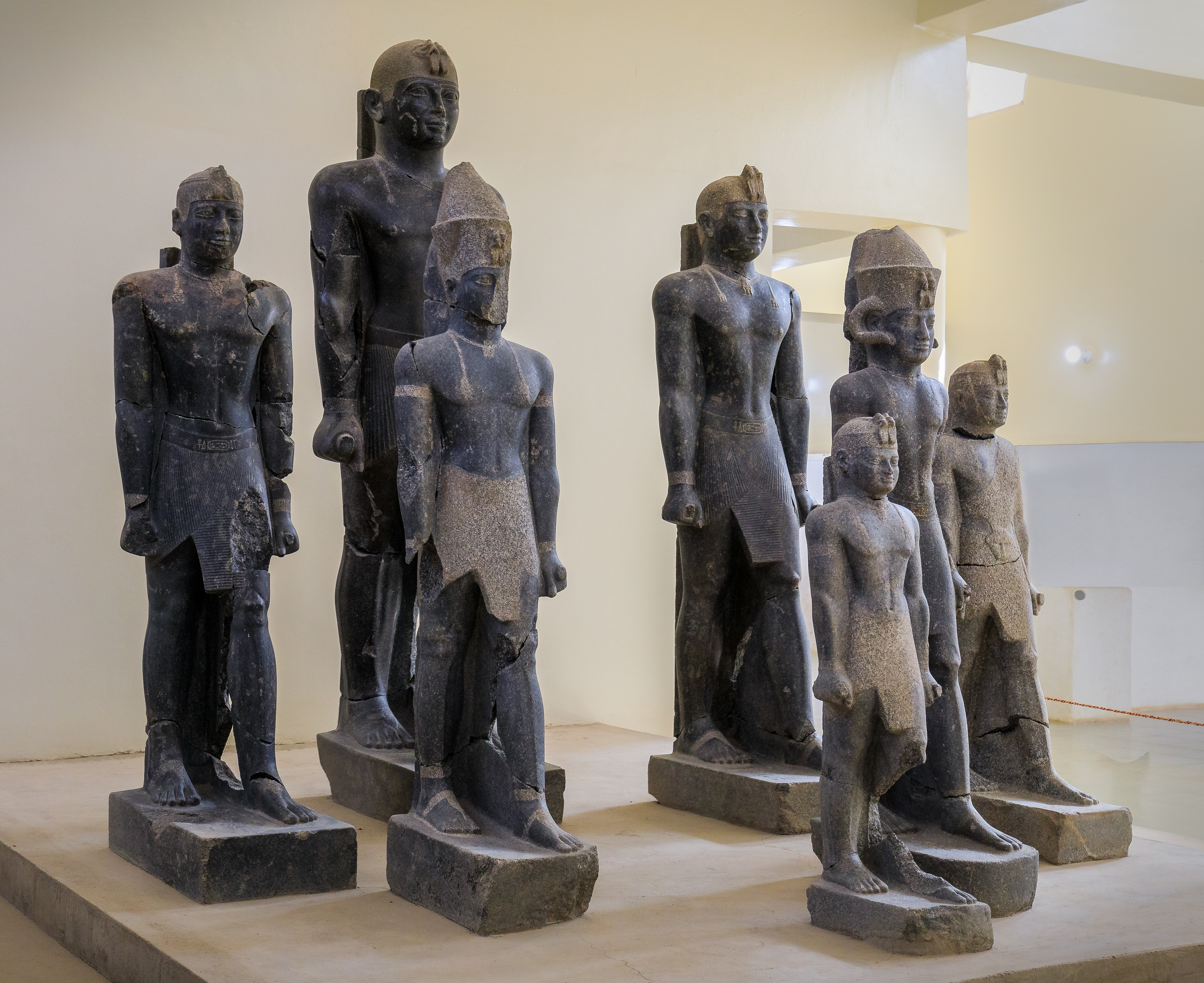
25th Dynasty

After the withdrawal of Egypt from Nubia at the end of the New Kingdom, a native dynasty took control of Nubia. Under king Piye, the Nubian founder of Twenty-Fifth Dynasty, the Nubians pushed north in an effort to crush his Libyan opponents ruling in the Delta. Piye managed to attain power as far as Memphis. His opponent Tefnakhte ultimately submitted to him, but he was allowed to remain in power in Lower Egypt and founded the short-lived Twenty-Fourth Dynasty at Sais. The Kushite kingdom to the south took full advantage of this division and political instability and defeated the combined might of several native-Egyptian rulers such as Peftjauawybast, Osorkon IV of Tanis, and Tefnakht of Sais. Piye was succeeded first by his brother, Shabaka, and then by his two sons Shebitku and Taharqa. Taharqa reunited the Two Lands of Northern and Southern Egypt and created an empire that was as large as it had been since the New Kingdom. Pharaohs such as Taharqa built or restored temples and monuments throughout the Nile valley, including at Memphis, Karnak, Kawa, and Jebel Barkal. It was during the 25th Dynasty that the Nile valley saw the first widespread construction of pyramids (many in modern Sudan) since the Middle Kingdom.

The international prestige of Egypt declined considerably by this time. The country's international allies had fallen under the sphere of influence of Assyria and from about 700 BC the question became when, not if, there would be war between the two states. Taharqa's reign and that of his successor, Tantamani, were filled with constant conflict with the Assyrians against whom there were numerous victories, but ultimately Thebes was occupied and Memphis sacked.

=== Late Period ===
From 671 BC on, Memphis and the Delta region became the target of many attacks from the Assyrians, who expelled the Nubians and handed over power to client kings of the Twenty-Sixth Dynasty. Psamtik I was the first recognized as the king of the whole of Egypt, and he brought increased stability to the country during a 54-year reign from the new capital of Sais. Four successive Saite kings continued guiding Egypt successfully and peacefully from 610 to 526 BC, keeping the Babylonians in certain measures away with the help of Greek mercenaries.

However, during this period Babylonian emperor Nebuchadnezzar II (605–562 BC) campaigned against the Egyptians and drove them back over the Sinai. In 567 BC he went to war with Pharaoh Amasis, and briefly invaded Egypt itself.

By the end of this period a new power was growing in the Near East: Persia. The Pharaoh Psamtik III had to face the might of Persia at Pelusium; he was defeated and briefly escaped to Memphis, but ultimately was captured and then executed.

=== Persian domination ===
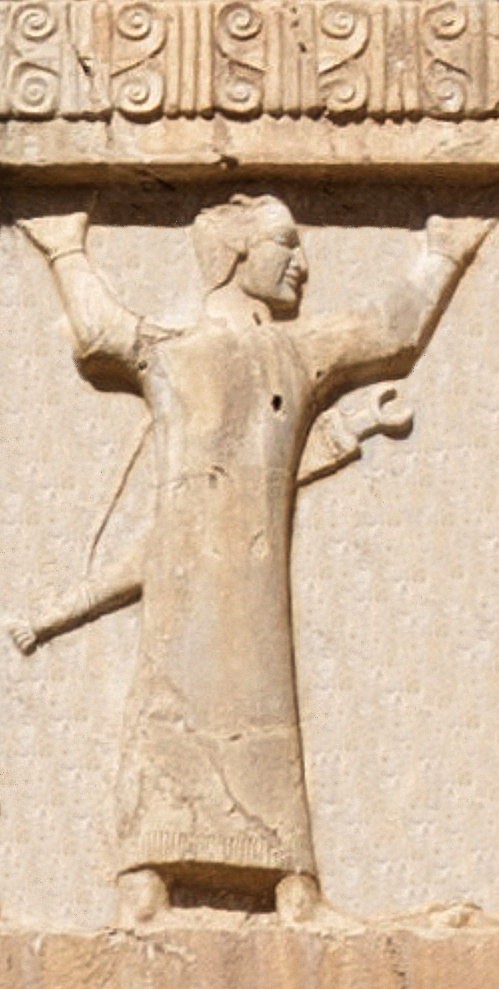
Egyptian soldier of the Achaemenid army, circa 470 BCE. Xerxes I tomb relief.

Achaemenid Egypt can be divided into two eras: the first period of Persian occupation, 525–404 BC (when Egypt became a satrapy), followed by an interval of independence, and the second and final period of occupation, 343–332 BC.

The Persian king Cambyses assumed the formal title of Pharaoh, called himself Mesuti-Re ("Re has given birth"), and sacrificed to the Egyptian gods. He founded the Twenty-seventh Dynasty. Egypt was then joined with Cyprus and Phoenicia in the sixth satrapy of the Achaemenid Empire.

Cambyses' successors Darius I the Great and Xerxes pursued a similar policy, visited the country, and warded off an Athenian attack. It is likely that Artaxerxes I and Darius II visited the country as well, although it is not attested, and did not prevent the Egyptians from feeling unhappy.

During the war of succession after the reign of Darius II, which broke out in 404 BC, the Egyptians revolted under Amyrtaeus and regained their independence. This sole ruler of the Twenty-eighth Dynasty died in 399, and power went to the Twenty-ninth Dynasty. The Thirtieth Dynasty was established in 380 BC and lasted until 343 BC. Nectanebo II was the last native king to rule Egypt.

Artaxerxes III (358–338 BC) reconquered Egypt for a brief period (343–332 BC). In 332 BC, Alexander the Great conquered the Nile valley. The Achaemenid rule had ended, and for a while Egypt was a satrapy in Alexander's empire. Later the Ptolemies and then the Romans successively ruled Egypt.

=== Ptolemaic dynasty ===
In 332 BC, Alexander III of Macedon conquered Egypt with little resistance from the Persians. He visited Memphis, and went on a pilgrimage to the oracle of Amun at the Siwa Oasis. The oracle declared him the son of Amun. He conciliated the Egyptians by the respect he showed for their religion, but he appointed Greeks to virtually all the senior posts in the country, and founded a new Greek city, Alexandria, to be the new capital. The wealth of Egypt could now be harnessed for Alexander's conquest of the rest of the Persian Empire. Early in 331 BC, he led his forces away to Phoenicia, never returning to Egypt.

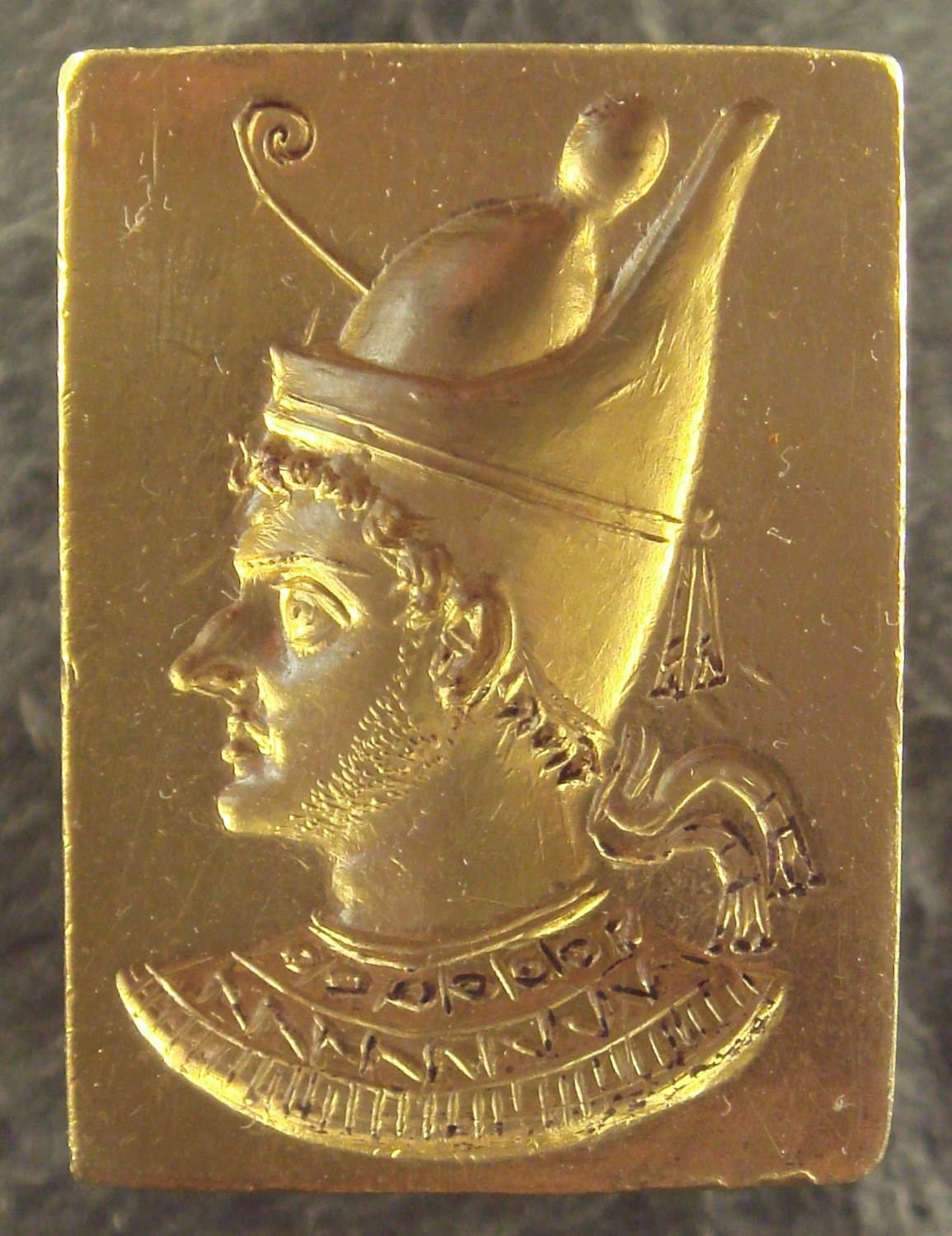
Ring with engraved portrait of Ptolemy VI Philometor as Pharao (3rd–2nd century BCE). Louvre Museum.

Following Alexander's death in Babylon in 323 BC, a succession crisis erupted among his generals. Perdiccas ruled the empire as regent for Alexander's half-brother Arrhidaeus, who became Philip III of Macedon, and Alexander's infant son Alexander IV of Macedon. Perdiccas appointed Ptolemy, one of Alexander's closest companions, to rule Egypt in the name of the joint kings. However, as Alexander's empire disintegrated, Ptolemy soon established himself as ruler in his own right. Ptolemy successfully defended Egypt against an invasion by Perdiccas in 321 BC and consolidated his position in Egypt and the surrounding areas during the Wars of the Diadochi (322–301 BC). In 305 BC, Ptolemy took the title of Pharaoh. As Ptolemy I Soter ("Saviour"), he founded the Ptolemaic dynasty that was to rule Egypt for nearly 300 years.

The later Ptolemies took on Egyptian traditions by marrying their siblings, had themselves portrayed on public monuments in Egyptian style and dress, and participated in Egyptian religious life. Hellenistic culture thrived in Egypt well after the Muslim conquest. The Egyptians soon accepted the Ptolemies as the successors to the pharaohs of independent Egypt. Ptolemy's family ruled Egypt until the Roman conquest of 30 BC.

All the male rulers of the dynasty took the name, Ptolemy. Ptolemaic queens regnant, some of whom were the sisters of their husbands, were usually called Cleopatra, Arsinoe or Berenice. The most famous member of the line was the last queen, Cleopatra VII, known for her role in the Roman political battles between Julius Caesar and Pompey, and later between Octavian and Mark Antony. Her apparent suicide at the conquest by Rome marked the end of Ptolemaic rule in Egypt.

== See also ==
- Ancient Egypt
- History of Egypt
- Population history of Egypt

== Sources ==
- Charron, Alain (1990), "L'époque thinite", L'Égypte des millénaires obscures, Paris, pp. 77–97.
- Robins, Gay (2008). The Art of Ancient Egypt (revised ed.). Harvard University Press. ISBN 978-0-674-03065-7.
- Stevenson, Alice (2015). The Petrie Museum of Egyptian Archaeology: Characters and Collections. London: UCLPress. ISBN 978-1-910634-04-2.

Open access pdf download.

- Trope, Betsy Teasley; Quirke, Stephen; Lacovara, Peter (2005), Excavating Egypt: great discoveries from the Petrie Museum of Egyptian Archaeology, University College, London, Atlanta: Michael C. Carlos Museum, Emory University.
- Wilkinson, TAH (1999), Early Dynastic Egypt, London; New York: Routledge.
