= El-Amra clay model of cattle =

Predynastic Egyptian sculpture

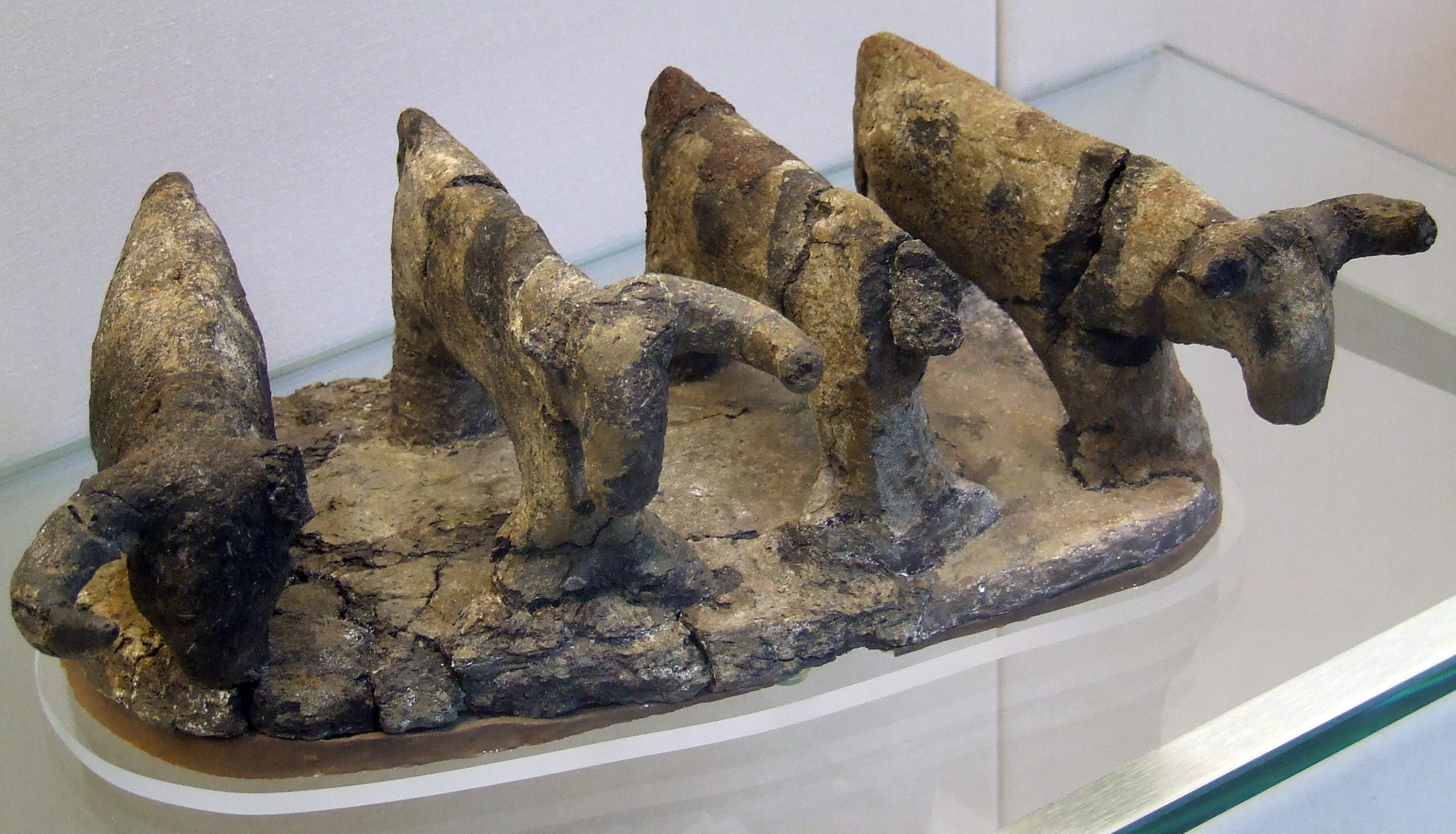
- Material: Pottery
- Size: Height: 8.2 cm (3.2 in); Length: 24.2 cm (9.5 in); Width: 15.3 cm (6.0 in)
- Created: c. 3,500 BC
- Period/culture: Naqada I
- Discovered: 1901
- Place: El-Amrah, Egypt, grave a.23
- Present location: Room 64, British Museum, London
- Identification: 35506
- Registration: 1901,1012.6

The El-Amra clay model of cattle is a small ceramic sculpture dating from the Predynastic, Naqada I period in Ancient Egypt, at around 3500 BC. It is one of several models found in graves at El-Amra in Egypt, and is now in the British Museum in London. The model is (at maximum) 8.2 centimetres high, 24.2 cm long and 15.3 cm wide. The model was made from clay, and fired at a low temperature before it was painted, however most of the paint is lost.

El-Amra shows four cattle standing in a row, depicted with black and white markings, with horns turned in and downwards. The head of one of the cows is missing, as are various parts of horns. This model was placed in a tomb, presumably to represent a source of food available to the deceased in the afterlife. At this very early stage of domestication Egyptian cattle were probably used mainly as a source of blood rather than for meat or dairy products. Traces of linen survive on the model, suggesting it was either placed in the grave under a cloth, or completely wrapped in one.

The model was donated to the British Museum by the Egypt Exploration Fund in 1901 and was conserved in 1993 prior to being displayed in the museum's newly refurbished Early Egypt Gallery (Room 64).

In 2010, the model was included as the eighth object in the series A History of the World in 100 Objects by British Museum director Neil MacGregor, broadcast on BBC Radio 4.

Preceded by 7: Ain Sakhri lovers	A History of the World in 100 Objects; Object 8	Succeeded by 9: Maya maize god statue
