= El-Amrah, Egypt =

Archaeological site in Egypt

Coordinates: 26°8′35.22″N 31°58′6.41″E

Map of Egypt showing El-Amra, (clickable map)

El-Amrah is a site about 120 km (75 mi) south of Badari, Upper Egypt.

Archaeological discoveries in 1901 at El-Amrah, were the basis of what is now known as the Amratian culture, a Naqada I culture of predynastic Upper Egypt, that lasted from 4400 BC to c. 3500 BC.

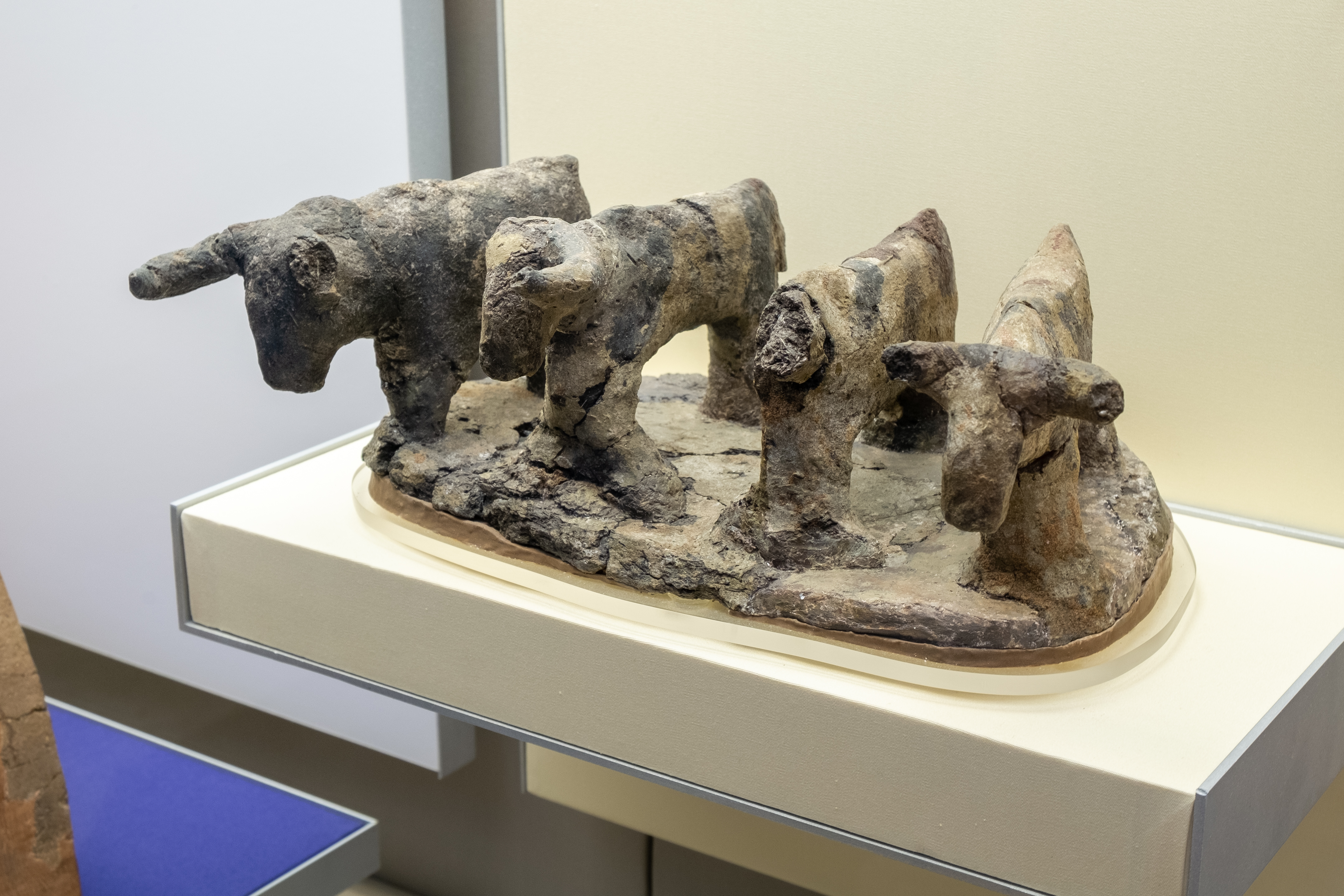
Model cattle, El-Amra, Naqada I, British Museum EA 35506

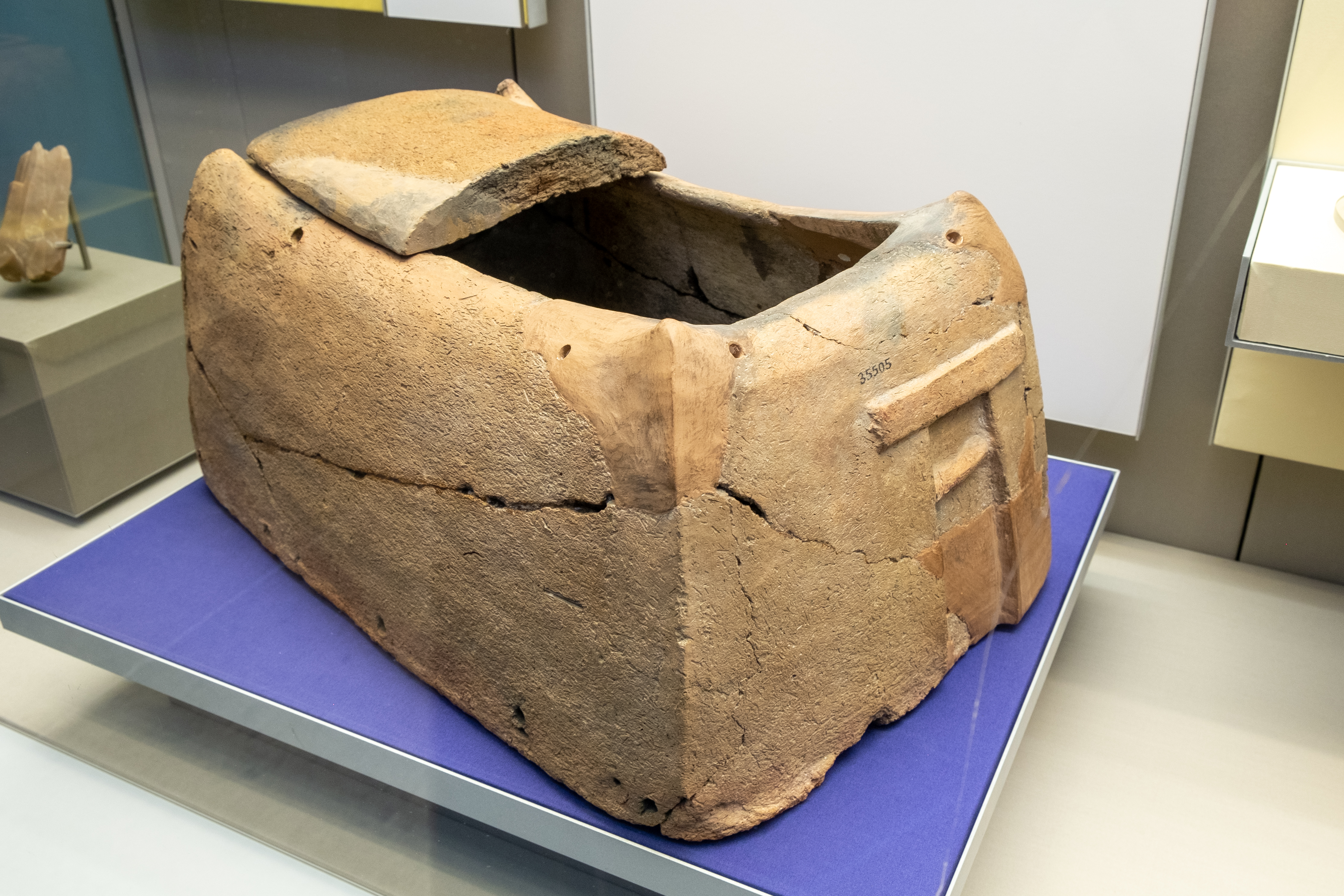
Pre-Dynastic model house, El-Amra, Naqada IIC until 3200 BC, British Museum EA35505

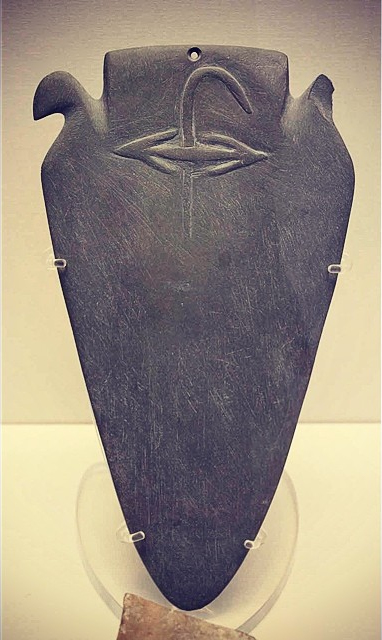
The Min Palette: a mudstone palette with the archaic hieroglyph for the god of fertility Min in relief. Pre-dynastic Naqada III. 3250–3100 BC. El-Amra
