= Great Sphinx of Giza =

Limestone statue of a resting sphinx

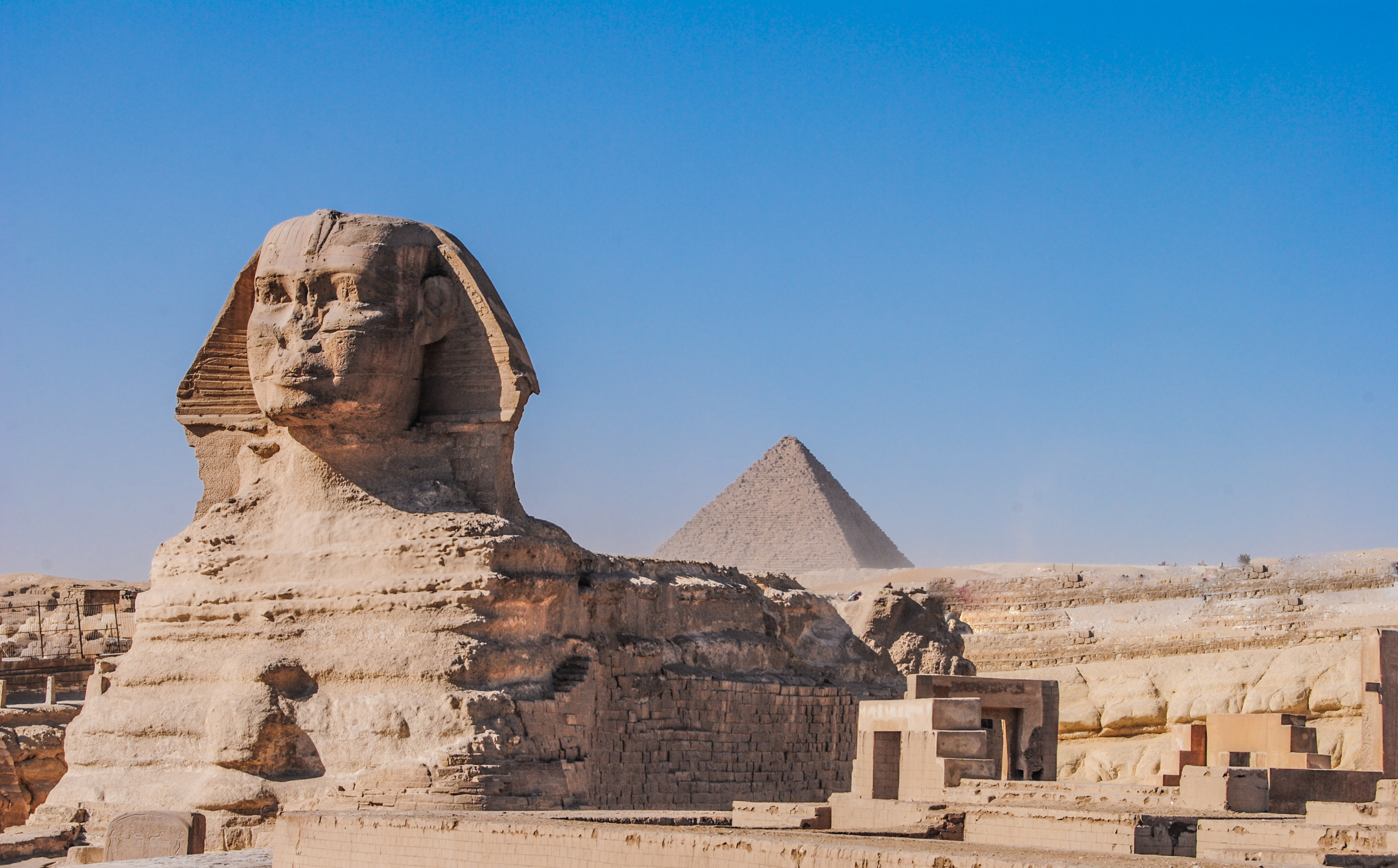
- The Great Sphinx, seen in 2017

- Location within Egypt
- 29°58′31″N 31°08′15″E
- Location: Giza, Egypt
- Region: Egypt

History
- Built: c. 26th century BC

Site notes
- Material: Limestone
- Height: 20 metres (66 ft)
- Length: 73 metres (240 ft)
- Width: 19 metres (62 ft)
- Condition: Partially restored

The Great Sphinx of Giza (Arabic: أبو الهول, romanized: ʾabū al-Hawl) is a limestone statue of a resting sphinx, a mythical creature with the head of a human and the body of a lion. The monument was sculpted from the limestone bedrock of the Eocene-aged Mokattam Formation and faces east on the Giza Plateau, on the west bank of the Nile in Giza, Egypt. The oldest known monumental sculpture in Egypt, the Sphinx is part of the Memphite Necropolis and is a UNESCO World Heritage Site.

Archaeological evidence suggests the Sphinx was created by Egyptians of the Old Kingdom during the reign of Khufu (c. 2590–2566 BC) or Khafre (c. 2558–2532 BC). Scholars and Egyptologists believe the face of the Sphinx was carved to represent either the pharaoh Khufu or one of his sons, pharaohs Djedefre and Khafre, but a consensus has not been reached and the person(s) in whose likeness the Sphinx was carved remains in dispute.

The Sphinx has undergone multiple restorations, the most recent of which involved replacing layers of limestone blocks around the base. The monument is 73 m (240 ft) long from paw to tail, 20 m (66 ft) high from the base to the top of the head, and 19 m (62 ft) wide at its rear haunches.

The circumstances of the destruction of the Sphinx's nose are unknown, but examinations of the face have shown evidence of a deliberate act with rods or chisels. Contrary to a popular myth, the nose was not destroyed by cannonfire from Napoleon's troops during his 1798 Egyptian campaign.

== Names ==
The original name the Old Kingdom creators gave the Sphinx is unknown, as the Sphinx temple, enclosure, and possibly the Sphinx itself were not completed at the time, and thus little is known about the statue's cultural context. In the New Kingdom, the Sphinx was revered as the solar deity Hor-em-akhet (English: "Horus of the Horizon"; Hellenized: Harmachis), and the 14th century BC pharaoh Thutmose IV (Note: See Thutmose IV#Dates and length of reign) specifically refers to it as such in his Dream Stele.

The commonly used name "Sphinx" was given to it in classical antiquity, around 2,000 years after the commonly accepted date of its construction by reference to a Greek mythological beast with the head of a woman, a falcon, a cat, or a sheep and the body of a lion with the wings of an eagle (although, like most Egyptian sphinxes, the Great Sphinx has a man's head and no wings). The English word sphinx comes from the ancient Greek Σφίγξ (transliterated: sphinx) apparently from the verb σφίγγω (transliterated: sphingo / English: to squeeze), after the Greek sphinx who strangled anyone who failed to answer her riddle.

Medieval Arab writers, including al-Maqrīzī, call the Sphinx by an Arabized Coptic name Belhib (Arabic: بلهيب), Balhubah (Arabic: بلهوبه) Belhawiyya (Arabic: بلهويه), which in turn comes from Pehor (Ancient Egyptian: pꜣ-Ḥwr) or Pehor(o)n (Ancient Egyptian: pꜣ-Ḥwr(w)n), a name of the Canaanite god Hauron with whom the Sphinx was identified. It is also rendered as Ablehon on a depiction of the Sphinx made by François de La Boullaye-Le Gouz. The medieval Egyptian Arabic name is Abū il-Hawl (أبو الهول), meaning "father of terror", which may be a folk etymological reinterpretation of the name of the god Ḥwr. In other source the medieval Egyptian Arabic name is Abul-Hun.

== History ==
=== Old Kingdom ===
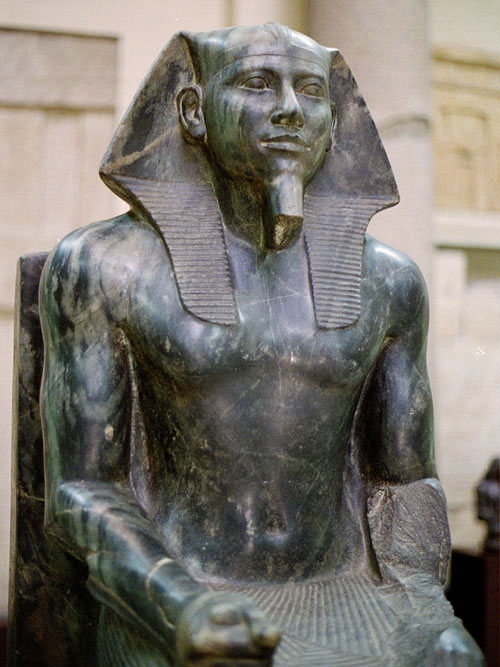
Before being defaced, the Great Sphinx possibly bore the face of Pharaoh Khafre, the builder of the second Pyramid at Giza

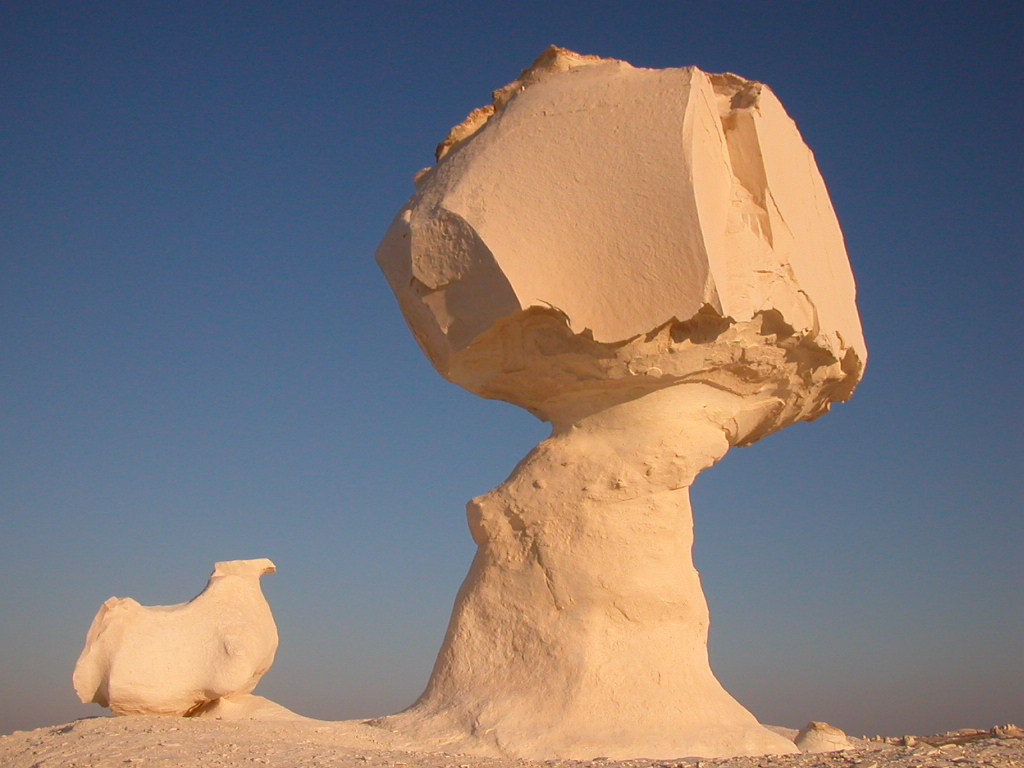
Natural rock formation at Farafra, Egypt

The archaeological evidence suggests the Great Sphinx was created between 2600 and 2500 BC for the king Khufu, the builder of the Great Pyramid of Giza, or his son Khafre, the builder of the second Pyramid at Giza. The Sphinx is a monolith carved from the bedrock of the plateau, which also served as the quarry for the pyramids and other monuments in the area. Egyptian geologist Farouk El-Baz has suggested the head of the Sphinx may have been carved first, out of a natural yardang: a ridge of bedrock sculpted by the wind. These can sometimes achieve shapes resembling animals. El-Baz suggests the "moat" or "ditch" around the Sphinx may have been quarried out later to allow for the creation of the full body of the sculpture. The stones cut from around the Sphinx's body were used to construct a temple in front of it; however, neither the enclosure nor the temple were completed, and the relative scarcity of Old Kingdom cultural material suggests a Sphinx cult was not established at the time. Selim Hassan, writing in 1949 on recent excavations of the Sphinx enclosure, makes note of this circumstance:

Taking all things into consideration, it seems that we must give the credit of erecting this, the world's most wonderful statue, to Khafre, but always with this reservation: that there is not one single contemporary inscription which connects the Sphinx with Khafre, so sound as it may appear, we must treat the evidence as circumstantial, until such time as a lucky turn of the spade of the excavator will reveal to the world a definite reference to the erection of the Sphinx.

— Hassan, page 164

In order to construct the temple, the northern perimeter wall of the Khafre Valley Temple had to be deconstructed; therefore, the Khafre funerary complex preceded the creation of the Sphinx and its temple. Furthermore, the angle and location of the south wall of the enclosure suggests the causeway connecting Khafre's pyramid and Valley Temple already existed before the Sphinx was planned. The lower base level of the Sphinx temple also indicates it does not pre-date the Valley Temple.

=== New Kingdom ===
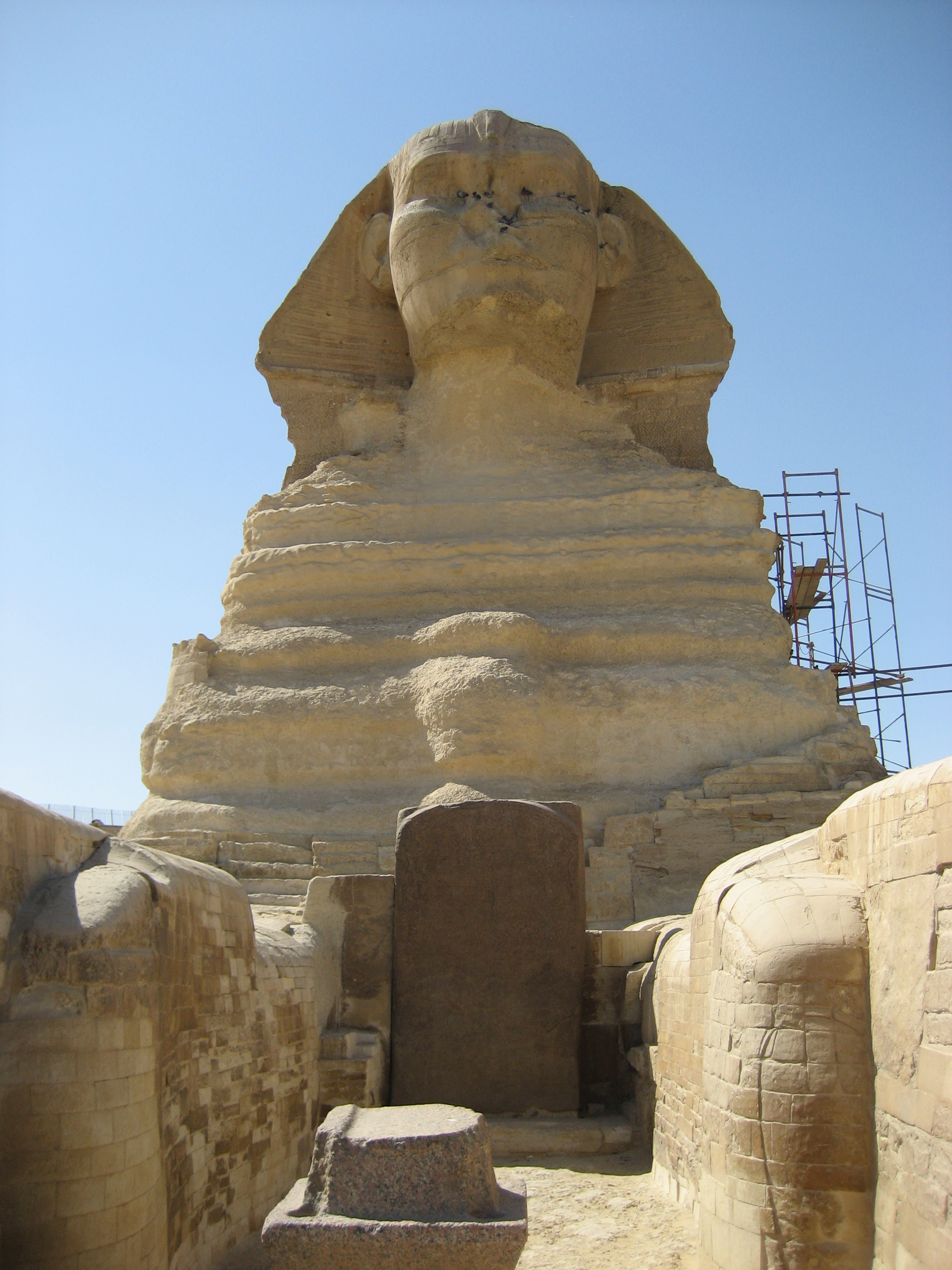
The New Kingdom Dream Stele between the paws of the Sphinx, 2009

Some time around the First Intermediate Period, the Giza Necropolis was abandoned, and drifting sand eventually buried the Sphinx up to its shoulders. The first documented attempt at an excavation dates to c. 1400 BC, when the young Thutmose IV (1401–1391 or 1397–1388 BC) gathered a team and, after much effort, managed to dig out the front paws, between which he erected a shrine housing the Dream Stele, an inscribed granite slab (possibly a repurposed door lintel from one of Khafre's temples). When the stele was discovered, its lines of text were already damaged and incomplete. An excerpt reads:

... the royal son, Thothmos, being arrived, while walking at midday and seating himself under the shadow of this mighty god, was overcome by slumber and slept at the very moment when Ra is at the summit [of heaven]. He found that the Majesty of this august god spoke to him with his own mouth, as a father speaks to his son, saying: Look upon me, contemplate me, O my son Thothmos; I am thy father, Harmakhis-Khopri-Ra-Tum; I bestow upon thee the sovereignty over my domain, the supremacy over the living ... Behold my actual condition that thou mayest protect all my perfect limbs. The sand of the desert whereon I am laid has covered me. Save me, causing all that is in my heart to be executed.

— The Stele of Thothmes IV: A Translation

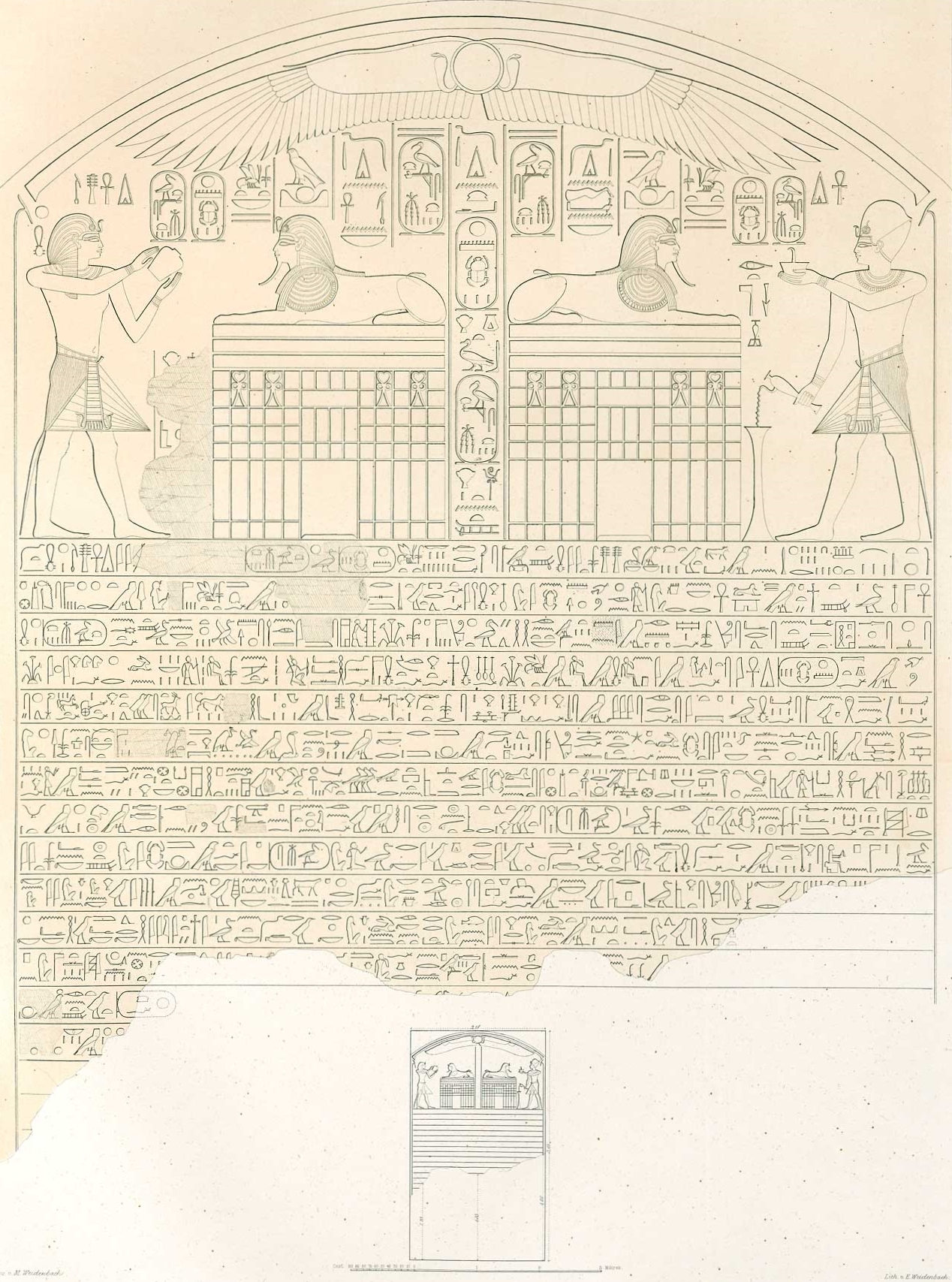
Dream Stele as recorded by Lepsius

The Dream Stele associates the Sphinx with Khafre. However, this part of the text is not entirely intact:

which we bring for him: oxen ... and all the young vegetables; and we shall give praise to Wenofer ... Khaf ... the statue made for Atum-Hor-em-Akhet.

— Jason Colavito, Who Built the Sphinx?

Egyptologist Thomas Young, finding the Khaf hieroglyphs in a damaged cartouche used to surround a royal name, inserted the glyph ra to complete Khafre's name. When the stele was re-excavated in 1925, the lines of text referring to Khaf had flaked off and were destroyed. Later, Ramesses II the Great (1279–1213 BC) may have undertaken a second excavation.

In the New Kingdom, the Sphinx became more specifically associated with the sun god Hor-em-akhet (Hellenized: Harmachis) or "Horus-at-the-Horizon". The Pharaoh Amenhotep II (1427–1401 or 1397 BC) built a temple to the northeast of the Sphinx nearly 1,000 years after its construction and dedicated it to the cult of Hor-em-akhet.

=== Graeco-Roman period ===
In Graeco-Roman times, Giza had become a tourist destination—the monuments were regarded as antiquities—and some Roman emperors visited the Sphinx out of curiosity and for political reasons. The Sphinx was cleared of sand again in the first century AD in honor of Emperor Nero and the Governor of Egypt Tiberius Claudius Balbilus. A monumental stairway—more than 12 metres (39 ft) wide—was erected, leading down to a pavement in front of the paws of the Sphinx. A podium positioned at the top of the stairs allowed a view into the Sphinx sanctuary. Farther back, another podium neighbored several more steps. The stairway was dismantled during the 1931–32 excavations by Émile Baraize. Pliny the Elder describes the face of the Sphinx being colored red and gives measurements for the statue:

In front of these pyramids is the Sphinx, a still more wondrous object of art, but one upon which silence has been observed, as it is looked upon as a divinity by the people of the neighbourhood. It is their belief that King Harmaïs was buried in it, and they will have it that it was brought there from a distance. The truth is, however, that it was hewn from the solid rock; and, from a feeling of veneration, the face of the monster is coloured red. The circumference of the head, measured round the forehead, is one hundred and two feet, the length of the feet being one hundred and forty-three, and the height, from the belly to the summit of the asp on the head, sixty-two.

A stela dated to 166 AD commemorates the restoration of the retaining walls surrounding the Sphinx. The last emperor connected with the monument is Septimius Severus, around 200 AD. With the downfall of Roman power, the Sphinx was once more engulfed by the sands.

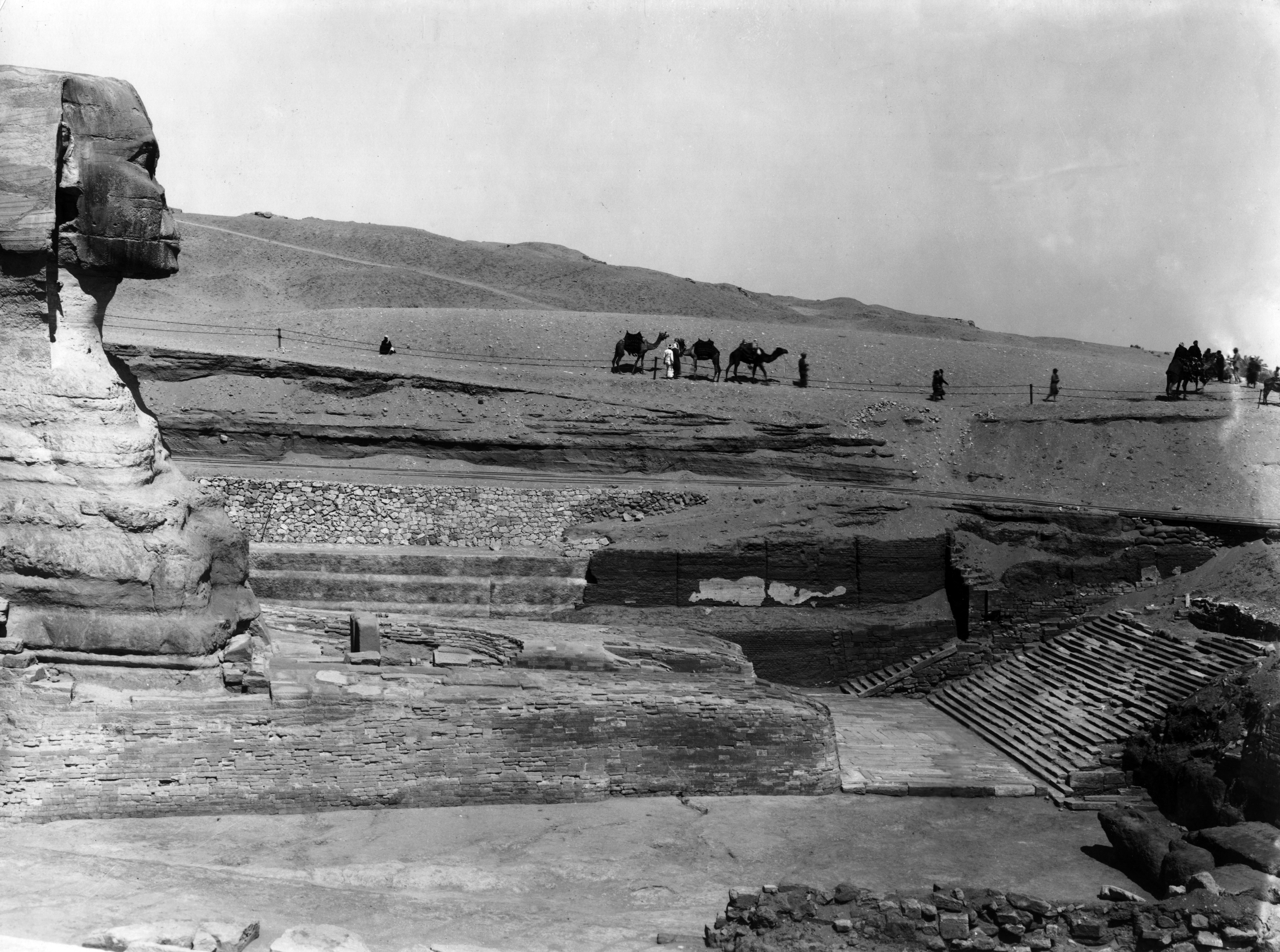
Side view of the Sphinx with the Roman stairway on the right, c. 1930

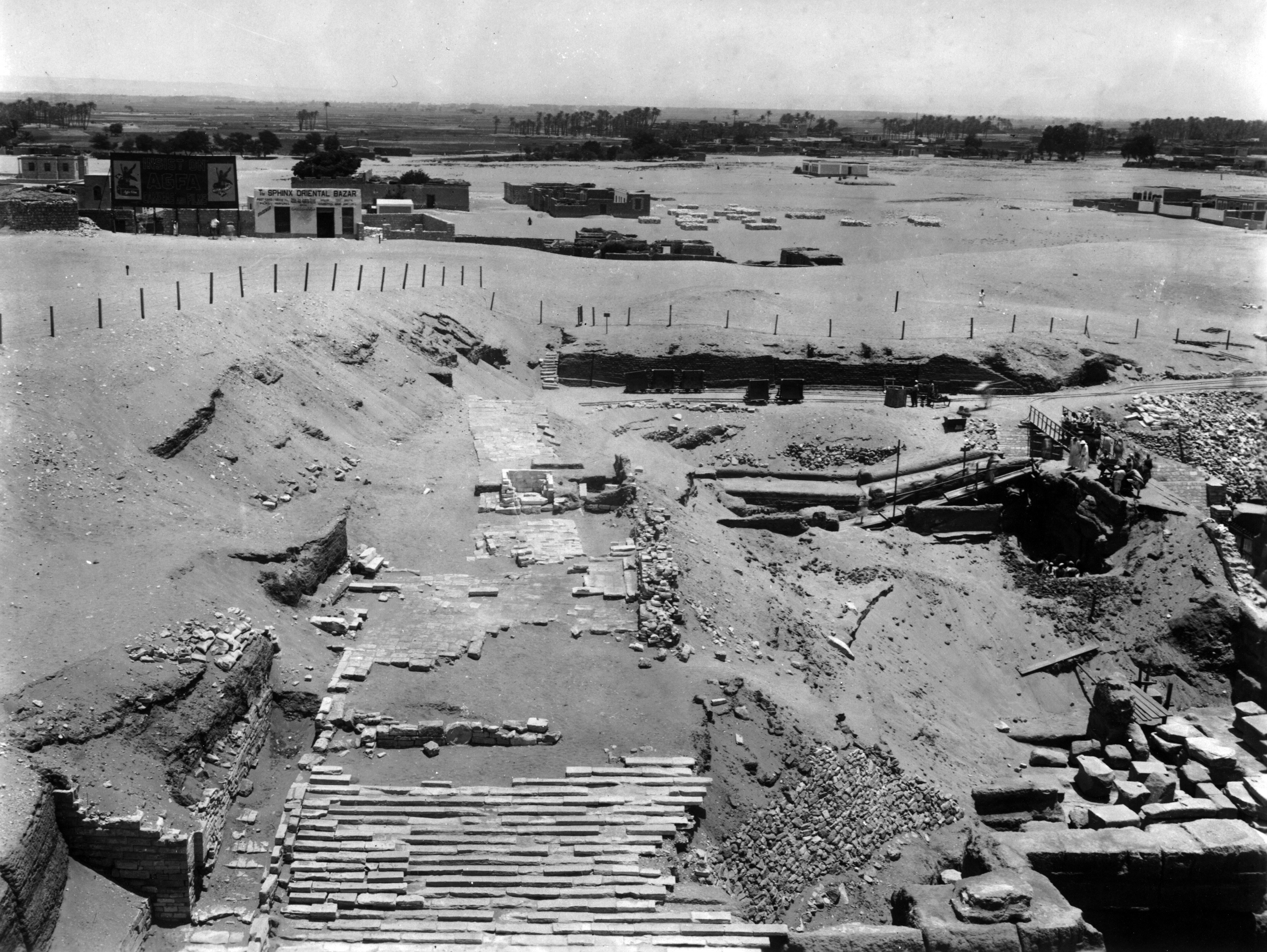
Top of the Roman stairway before dismantling in 1931–1932

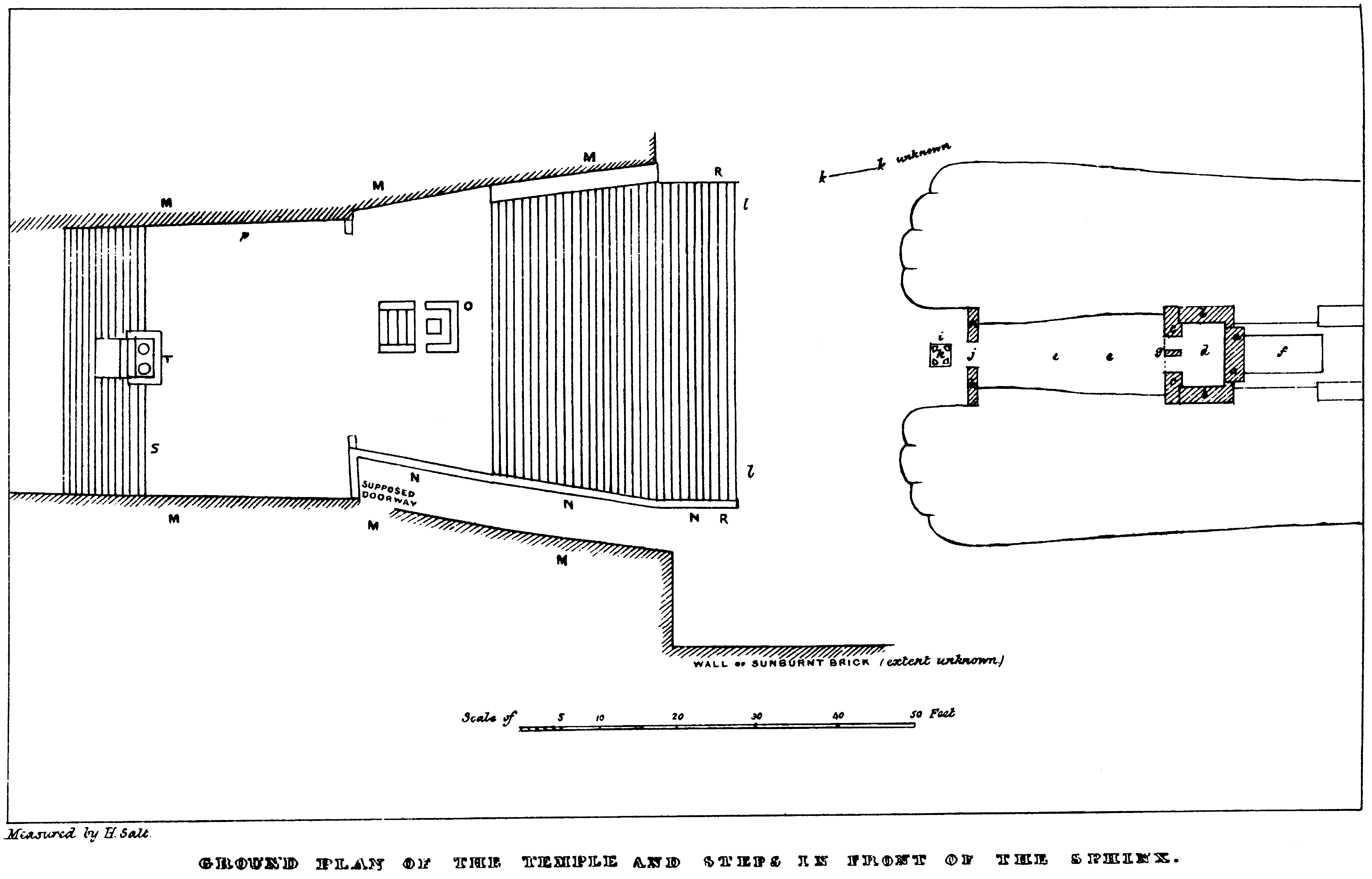
Map of the area east of the Sphinx by Henry Salt

=== Middle Ages ===
Some ancient non-Egyptians saw the Sphinx as a likeness of the god Hauron. The cult of the Sphinx continued into medieval times. The Harranians saw it as the burial place of Hermes Trismegistus. Arab authors describe the Sphinx as a talisman guarding the area from the desert. Al-Maqrizi describes it as the "talisman of the Nile" upon which locals believed the flood cycle depended. Muhammad al-Idrisi stated those wishing to obtain bureaucratic positions in the Egyptian government gave incense offering to the monument.

=== Early modern period ===
Over the centuries, writers and scholars have recorded their impressions and reactions upon seeing the Sphinx. The vast majority were concerned with a general description, often including a mixture of science, romance and mystique. A description was made by John Lawson Stoddard:

It is the antiquity of the Sphinx which thrills us as we look upon it, for in itself it has no charms. The desert's waves have risen to its breast, as if to wrap the monster in a winding-sheet of gold. The face and head have been mutilated by Moslem fanatics. The mouth, the beauty of whose lips was once admired, is now expressionless. Yet grand in its loneliness, – veiled in the mystery of unnamed ages, – the relic of Egyptian antiquity stands solemn and silent in the presence of the awful desert – symbol of eternity. Here it disputes with Time the empire of the past; forever gazing on and on into a future which will still be distant when we, like all who have preceded us and looked upon its face, have lived our little lives and disappeared.

— John L. Stoddard's Lectures

From the 16th to the 19th centuries, European observers described the Sphinx having the face, neck and breast of a woman. Examples included Johannes Helferich (1579), George Sandys (1615), Johann Michael Vansleb (1677), Benoît de Maillet (1735) and Elliot Warburton (1844). Most early Western images were book illustrations in print form, elaborated by a professional engraver from either previous images available or some original drawing or sketch supplied by an author, and usually now lost. Seven years after visiting Giza, André Thévet (Cosmographie de Levant, 1556) described the Sphinx as "the head of a colossus, caused to be made by Isis, daughter of Inachus, then so beloved of Jupiter". He, or his artist and engraver, pictured it as a curly-haired monster with a grassy dog collar. Athanasius Kircher (who never visited Egypt) depicted the Sphinx as a Roman statue (Turris Babel, 1679). Johannes Helferich's (1579) Sphinx is a pinched-face, round-breasted woman with a straight-haired wig. George Sandys stated the Sphinx was a harlot; Balthasar de Monconys interpreted the headdress as a kind of hairnet, and François de La Boullaye-Le Gouz described the Sphinx as having a rounded hairdo with bulky collar. Richard Pococke's Sphinx was an adaptation of Cornelis de Bruijn's drawing of 1698, featuring only minor changes, but is closer to the actual appearance of the Sphinx than anything previous. The print versions of Norden's drawings for his Voyage d'Egypte et de Nubie, 1755 clearly show the missing nose.

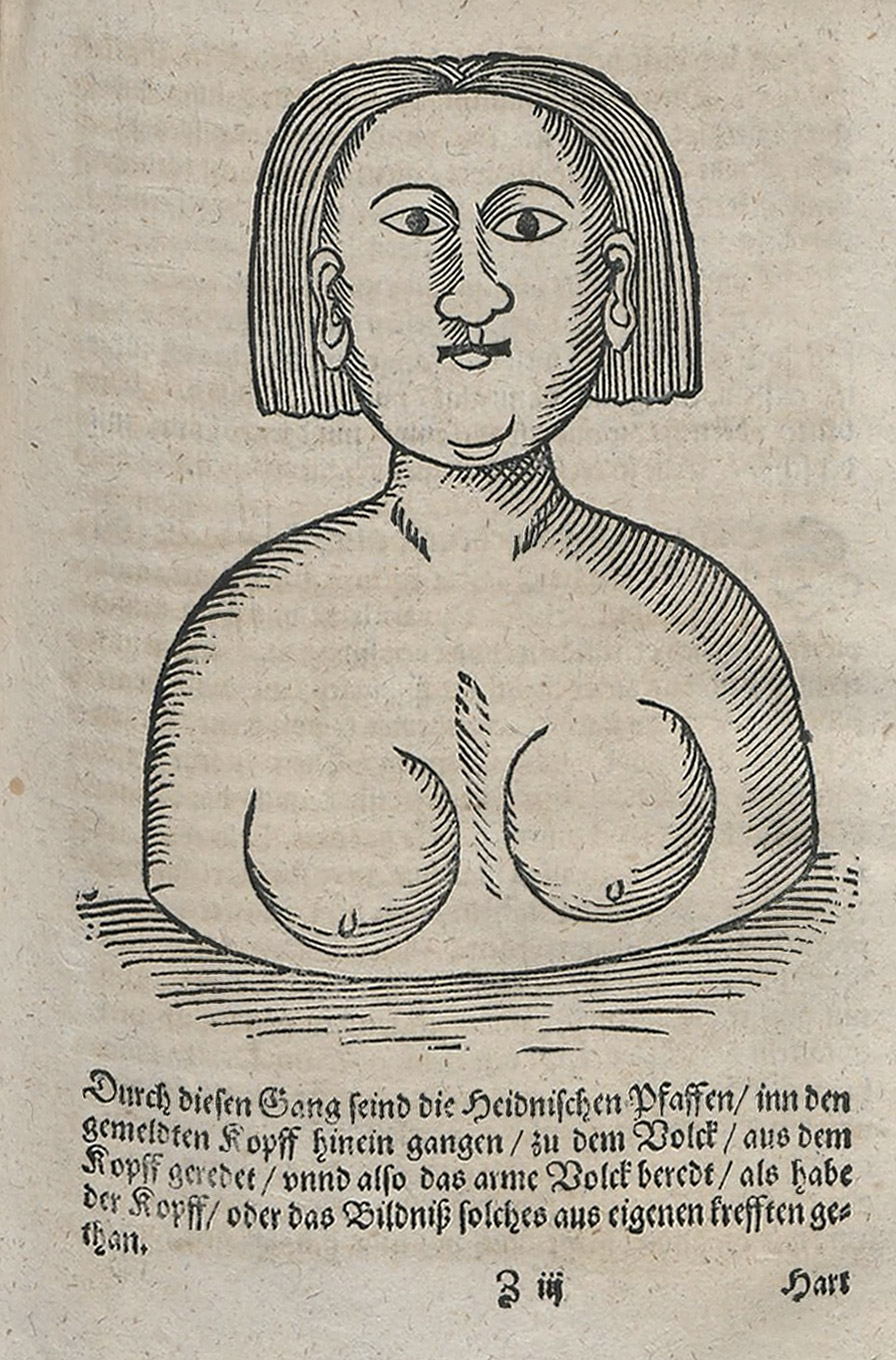
Depiction of the sphinx in Johann Helffrich's travelogue from 1589

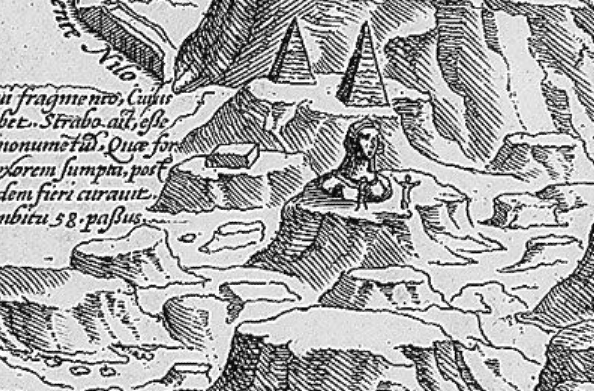
Hogenberg and Braun (map), Cairus, quae olim Babylon (1572), exists in various editions, from various authors, with the Sphinx looking different.

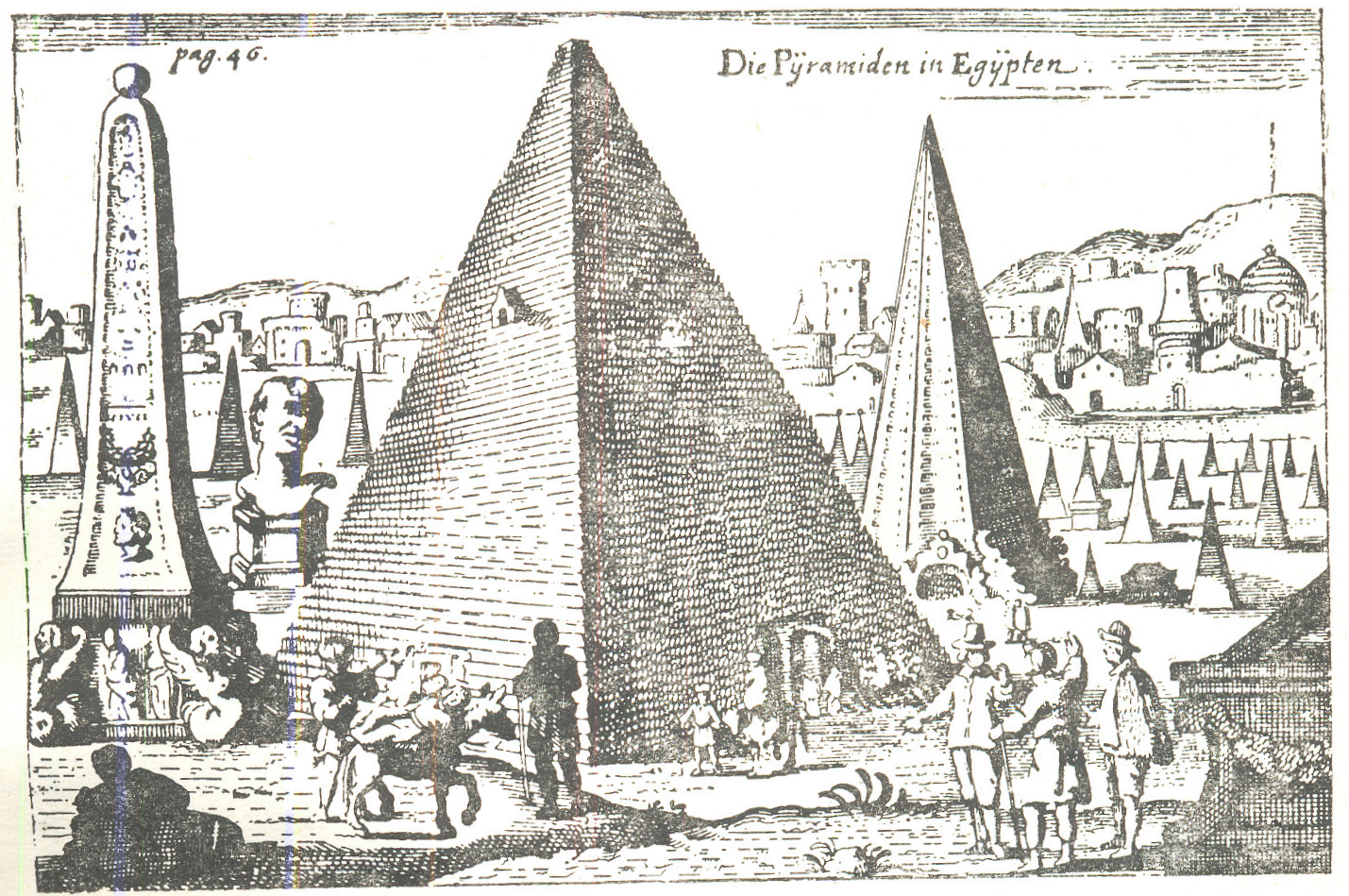
Jan Sommer, (unpublished) Voyages en Egypte des annees 1589, 1590 & 1591, Institut de France, 1971 (Voyageurs occidentaux en Égypte 3)

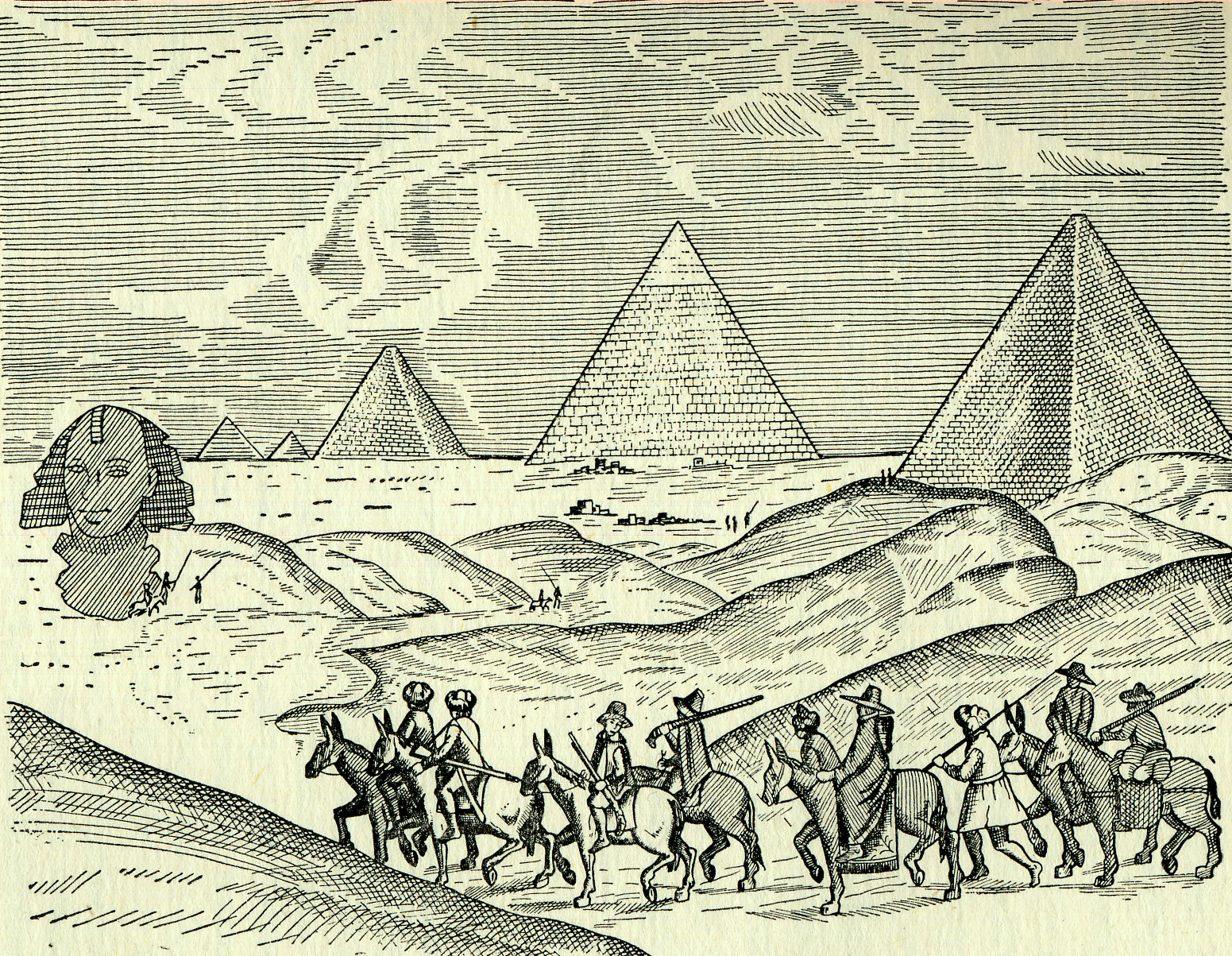
George Sandys, A relation of a journey begun an dom. 1610 (1615)

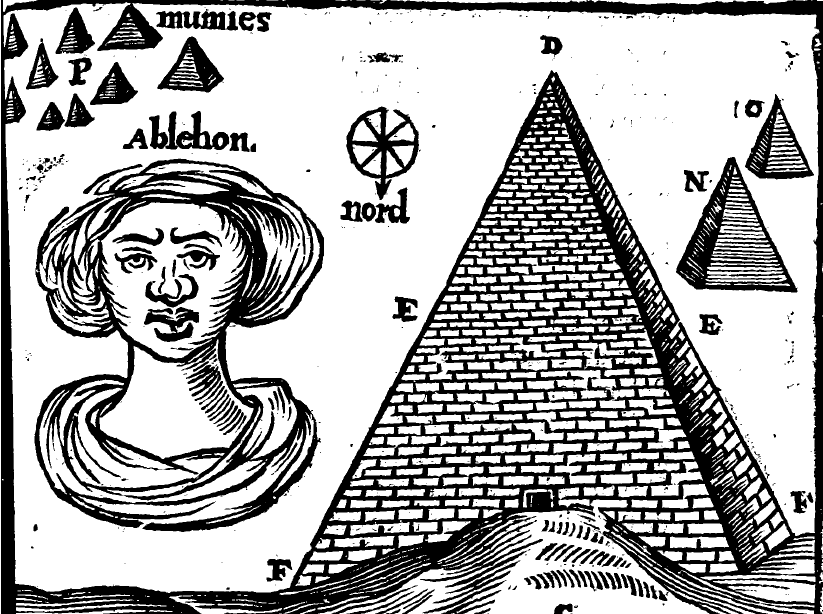
François de La Boullaye-Le Gouz, Les Voyages et Observations (1653)

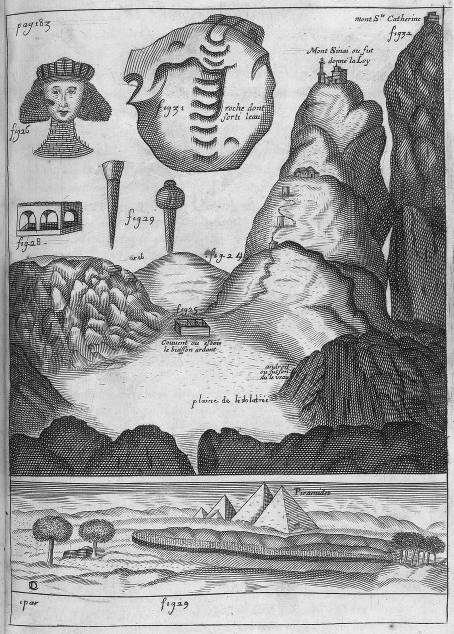
Balthasar de Monconys, Journal des voyages (1665)

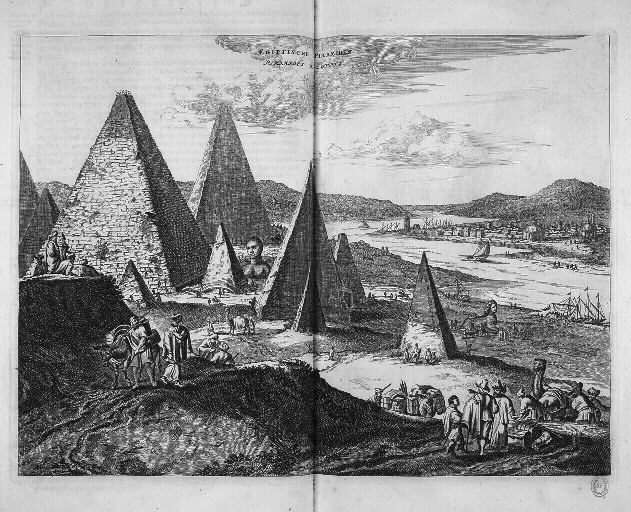
Olfert Dapper, Description de l'Afrique (1665), note the two different displays of the Sphinx.

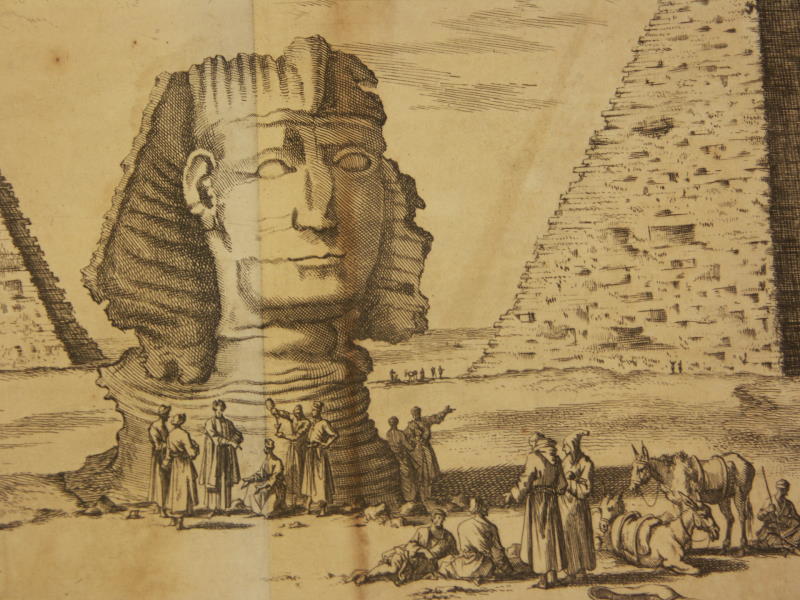
Cornelis de Bruijn, Reizen van Cornelis de Bruyn door de vermaardste Deelen van Klein Asia (1698)

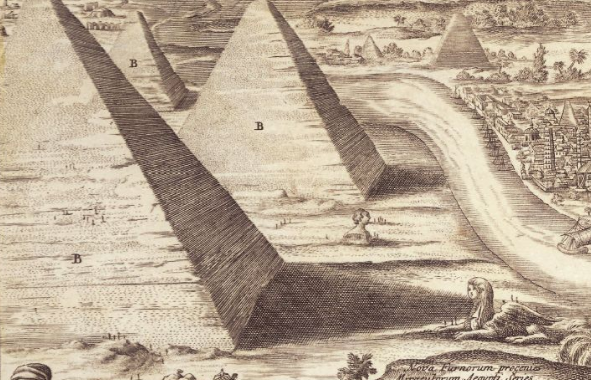
Johanne Baptista Homann (map), Aegyptus hodierna (1724)

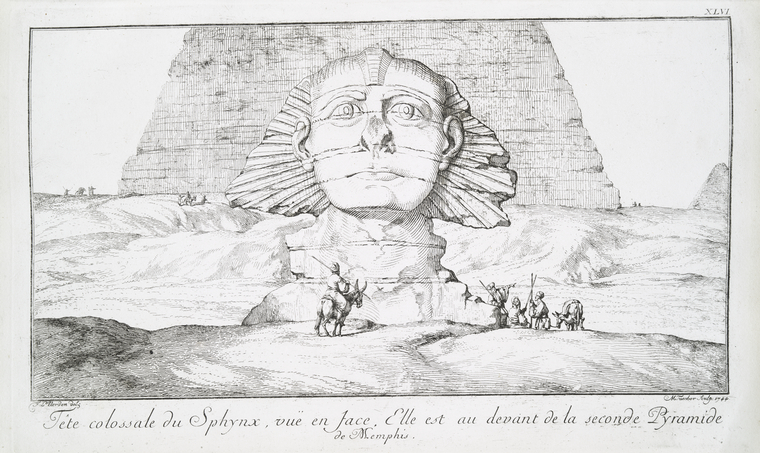
Frederic Louis Norden, Voyage d'Égypte et de Nubie (1755)

=== Modern excavations ===
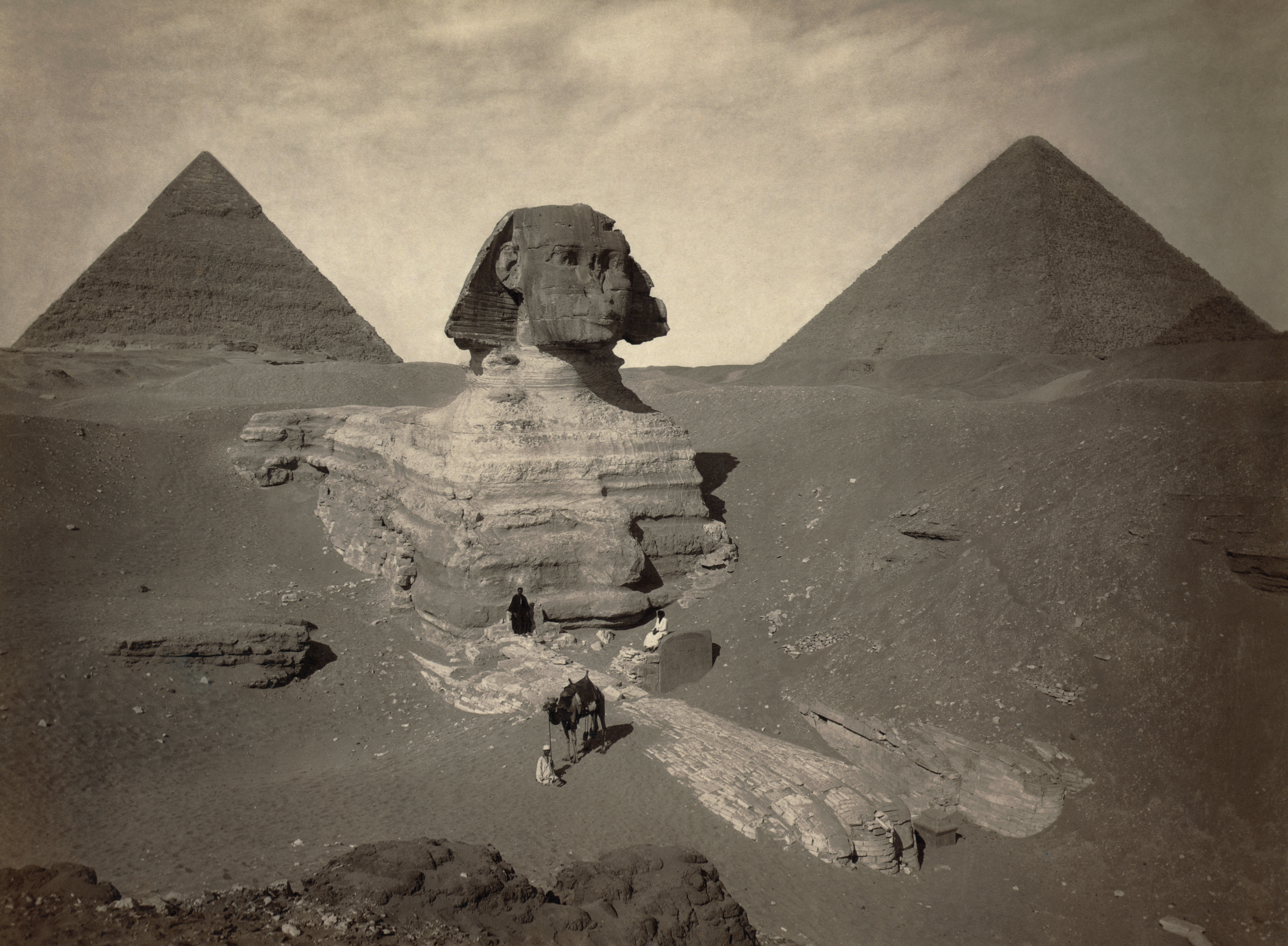
The Great Sphinx partially excavated, ca. 1883

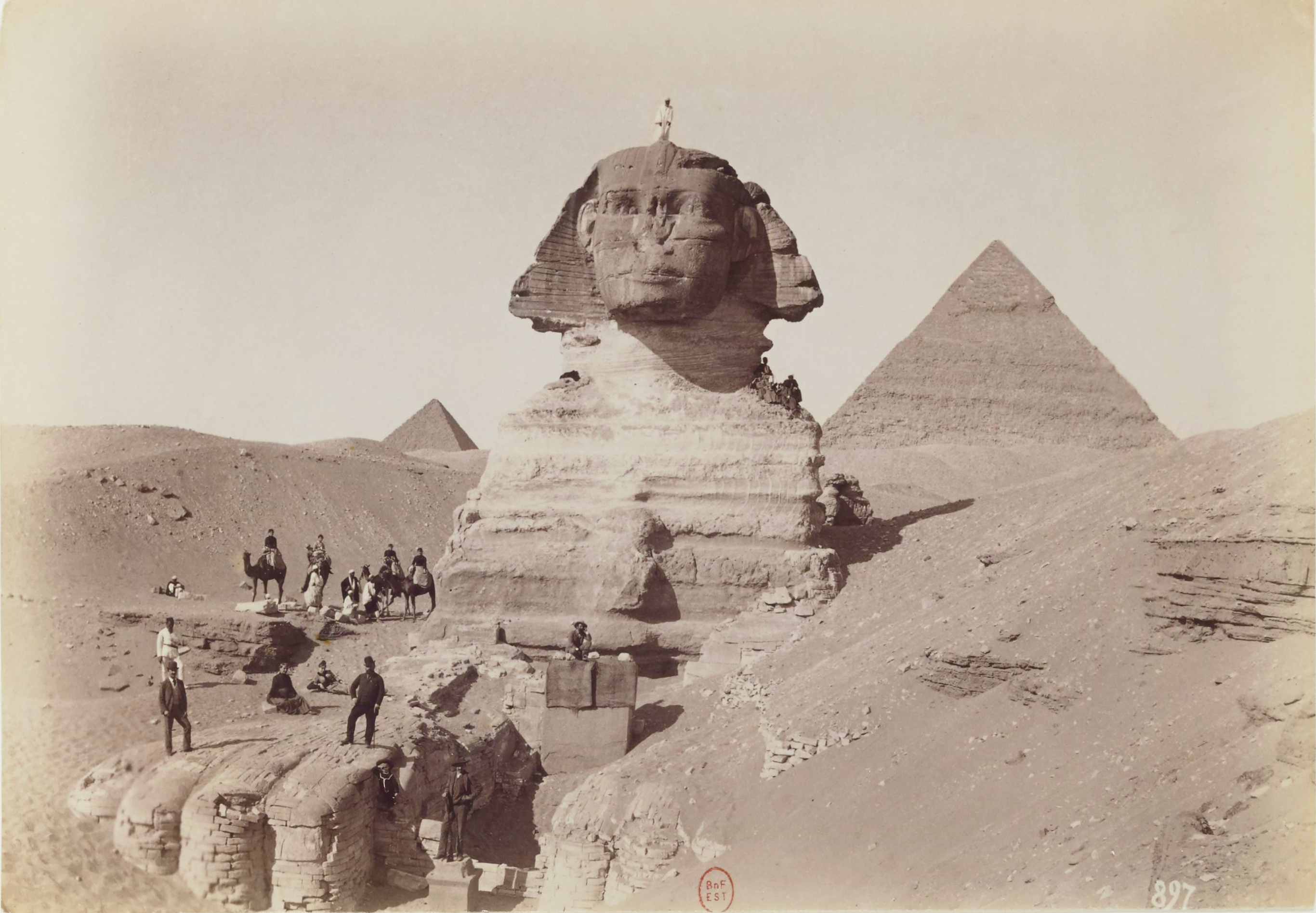
The Sphinx by Beniamino Facchinelli, c. 1885

In 1817, the first modern archaeological dig, supervised by the Italian Giovanni Battista Caviglia, uncovered the Sphinx's chest completely.

In the beginning of the year 1887, the chest, the paws, the altar, and plateau were all made visible. Flights of steps were unearthed, and finally accurate measurements were taken of the great figures. The height from the lowest of the steps was found to be one hundred feet, and the space between the paws was found to be thirty-five feet long and ten feet wide. Here there was formerly an altar; and a stele of Thûtmosis IV was discovered, recording a dream in which he was ordered to clear away the sand that even then was gathering round the site of the Sphinx.

— S. Rappoport, The Project Gutenberg EBook of History of Egypt From 330 B.C. To The Present, Volume 12

One of the people working on clearing the sands from around the Great Sphinx was Eugène Grébaut, a French Director of the Antiquities Service.

=== Opinions of early Egyptologists ===
Early Egyptologists and excavators had conflicting opinions regarding the age of the Sphinx and the associated temples. In 1857, Auguste Mariette, founder of the Egyptian Museum in Cairo, unearthed the much later Inventory Stela (estimated to be from the Twenty-sixth Dynasty, c. 664–525 BC), which tells how Khufu came upon the Sphinx, already buried in sand. Although certain tracts on the stela are likely accurate, this passage is contradicted by archaeological evidence, thus considered to be Late Period historical revisionism, a purposeful fake, created by the local priests as an attempt to imbue the contemporary Isis temple with an ancient history it never had. Such acts became common when religious institutions such as temples, shrines, and priests' domains fought for political attention, and for financial and economic donations.

In 1883, Flinders Petrie wrote, regarding the state of opinion of the age of the Khafre Valley Temple, and by extension the Sphinx: "The date of the Granite Temple has been so positively asserted to be earlier than the fourth dynasty, that it may seem rash to dispute the point. Recent discoveries, however, strongly show that it was really not built before the reign of Khafre, in the fourth dynasty." Gaston Maspero, the French Egyptologist and second director of the Egyptian Museum in Cairo, conducted a survey of the Sphinx in 1886. Maspero concluded because the Dream Stela showed the cartouche of Khafre in line 13, it was he who was responsible for the excavation and therefore the Sphinx must predate Khafre and his predecessors—possibly Fourth Dynasty, c. 2575–2467 BC. Maspero believed the Sphinx to be "the most ancient monument in Egypt".

Ludwig Borchardt attributed the Sphinx to the Middle Kingdom, arguing the particular features seen on the Sphinx are unique to the 12th dynasty and the Sphinx resembles Amenemhat III. E. A. Wallis Budge agreed the Sphinx predated Khafre's reign, writing in The Gods of the Egyptians (1904): "This marvelous object [the Great Sphinx] was in existence in the days of Khafre, or Khephren, (Note: Early Egyptologists were inconsistent in their transliteration of pharaonic names: Khafre and Khephren are both references to Khafre.) and it is probable that it is a very great deal older than his reign and that it dates from the end of the archaic period [c. 2686 BC]." Selim Hassan reasoned the Sphinx was erected after the completion of the Khafre pyramid complex.

=== Modern dissenting hypotheses ===
Rainer Stadelmann, former director of the German Archaeological Institute in Cairo, examined the distinct iconography of the nemes (headdress) and the now-detached beard of the Sphinx and concluded the style is more indicative of the pharaoh Khufu (2589–2566 BC), known to the Greeks as Cheops, builder of the Great Pyramid of Giza and Khafre's father. He supports this by suggesting Khafre's Causeway was built to conform to a pre-existing structure, which, he concludes, given its location, could only have been the Sphinx.

In 2004, Vassil Dobrev of the Institut Français d'Archéologie Orientale in Cairo announced he had uncovered new evidence the Great Sphinx may have been the work of the little-known pharaoh Djedefre (2528–2520 BC), Khafre's half brother and a son of Khufu. Dobrev suggests Djedefre built the Sphinx in the image of his father Khufu, identifying him with the sun god Ra in order to restore respect for their dynasty. Dobrev also says the causeway connecting Khafre's pyramid to the temples was built around the Sphinx, suggesting it was already in existence at the time. Egyptologist Nigel Strudwick responded to Dobrev, saying: "It is not implausible. But I would need more explanation, such as why he thinks the pyramid at Abu Roash is a sun temple, something I'm sceptical about. I have never heard anyone suggest that the name in the graffiti at Zawiyet el-Aryan mentions Djedefre. I remain more convinced by the traditional argument of [the sphinx] being Khafre or the more recent theory of it being Khufu."

Geologist Colin Reader suggests water runoff from the Giza plateau is responsible for the differential erosion on the walls of the sphinx enclosure. Because the hydrological characteristics of the area were significantly changed by the quarries, Reader contends this suggests the sphinx likely predated the quarries (and thus, the pyramids). He points towards the larger cyclopean stones in part of the Sphinx Temple, as well as the causeway alignment with the pyramids and the break in the quarries, as evidence the pyramids took the alignment with some pre-existing structure, such as the sphinx, into consideration when they were constructed, and the sphinx temple was built in two distinct phases. He contends such erosion could have occurred relatively rapidly and suggests the sphinx was no more than a few centuries older than present archaeology would suggest, suggesting a late Predynastic or Early Dynastic origin, when Ancient Egyptians already were known to be capable of sophisticated masonry.

=== Recent restorations ===
In 1931, engineers of the Egyptian government repaired the head of the Sphinx. Part of its headdress had fallen off in 1926 due to erosion, which had also cut deeply into its neck. This questionable repair was by the addition of a concrete collar between the headdress and the neck, creating an altered profile. Many renovations to the stone base and raw rock body were done in the 1980s and then redone in the 1990s.

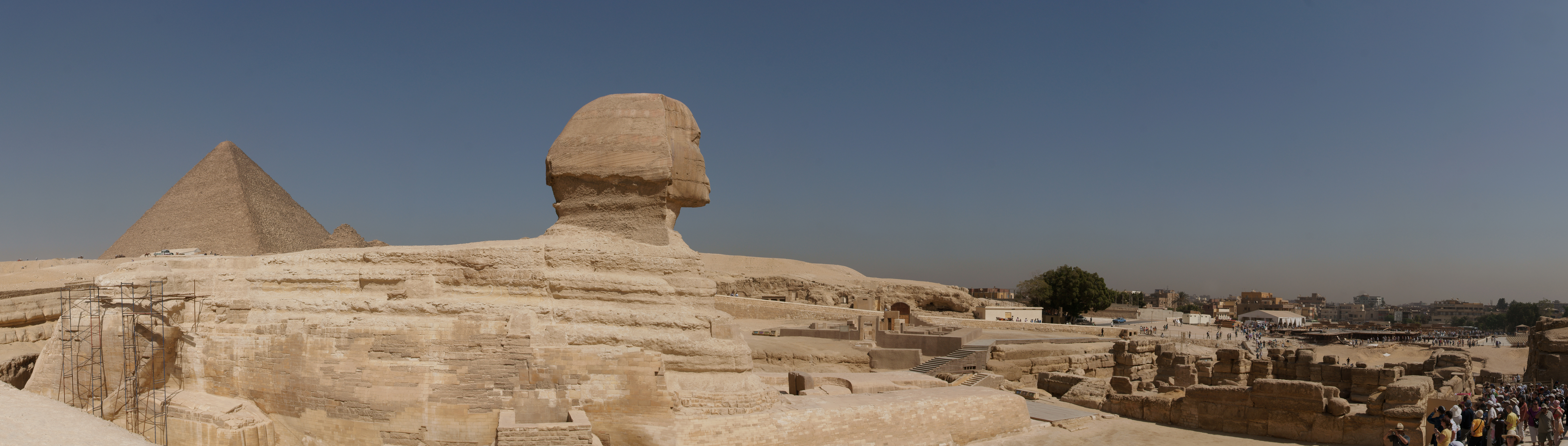
Panoramic view of the Sphinx and the Great Pyramid of Giza, 2010

== Degradation and violation ==
The nummulitic limestone in the area consists of layers with varying resistance to the erosion caused primarily by wind and windblown sand, resulting in the uneven degradation evident in the body of the Sphinx. The lowest part of the body, including the legs, is solid rock. The middle body of the Sphinx has significantly disintegrated because the limestone from which it is comprised is softer than the surrounding rock, whereas the layer from which the head was sculpted is a harder limestone and therefore more resistant to erosion. Treasure hunters and tomb robbers have dug several "dead-end" shafts and passageways within and below the body of the Sphinx.

=== Missing nose ===
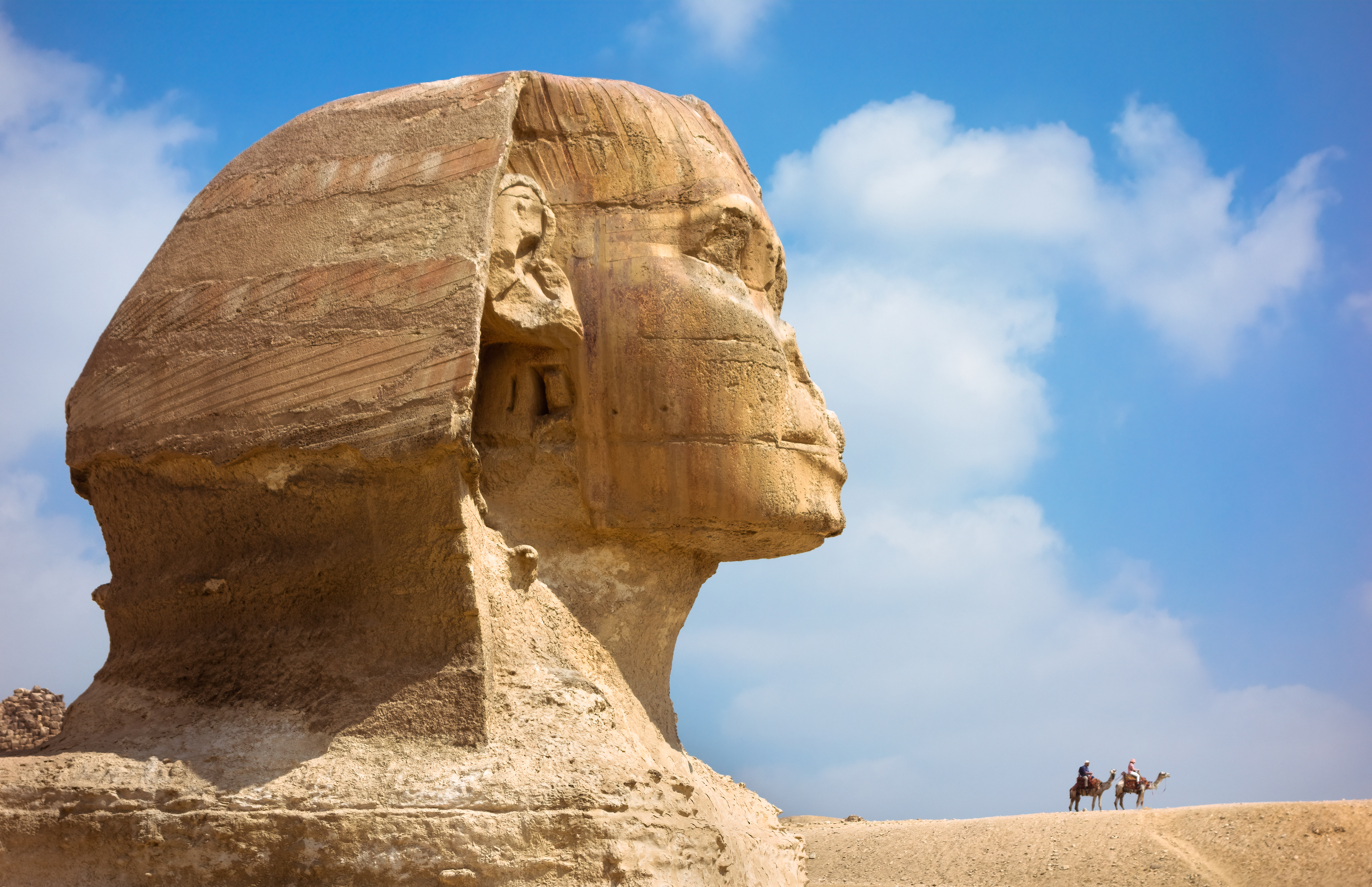
Profile, 2023

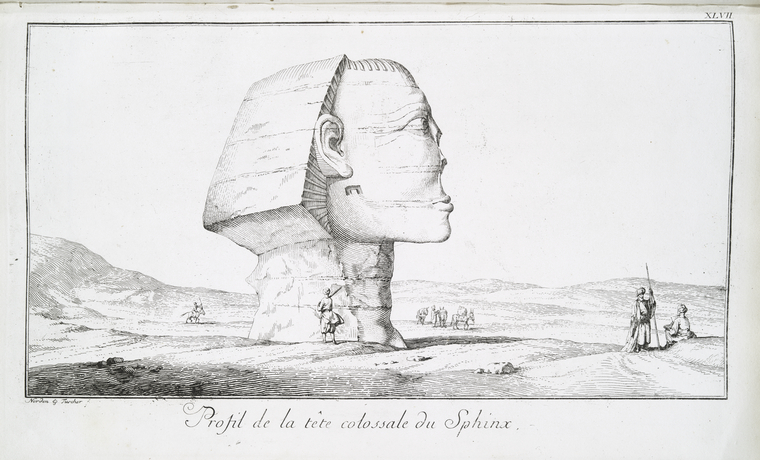
Drawing by Frederic Louis Norden in 1737

The destruction and fate of the Sphinx's missing nose has long been the subject of myths and stories. Examination of the Sphinx's face shows marks made by long rods or chisels hammered into the face: one at the bridge of the nose, and another below the nostril. The nose was apparently then pried off, and the stonework crumbled as it fell or was subsequently destroyed.

The most popular legend of its destruction claims that it was destroyed by cannonballs fired by the army of Napoleon Bonaparte. However, it has been documented as damaged since at least the 10th century.

Some 10th-century Arab authors claimed the damaged nose was the result of iconoclastic attacks. Other writers have attributed the damage to the Mamluks in the 14th century. According to Ibn Qadi Shuhba, Muhammad ibn Sadiq ibn al-Muhammad al-Tibrizi al-Masri (d. 1384), desecrated the sphinxes of "Qanatir al-Siba".

Writing in the early 15th century, Arab historian al-Maqrīzī attributed the loss of the nose to Muhammad Sa'im al-Dahr, a Sufi Muslim from the khanqah of Sa'id al-Su'ada in 1378. According to al-Maqrīzī, Sa'im al-Dahr saw local peasants making offerings to the Sphinx in the hope of increasing their harvest and defaced the Sphinx in an act of iconoclasm. According to al-Maqrīzī, people living in the area believed the sand covering the Giza Plateau was retribution for al-Dahr's act of defacement. Al-Minufi (1443–1527) wrote the Alexandrian Crusade in 1365 was, "...divine retribution for Muhammad Sa'im al-Dahr's breaking off the nose of a sphinx."

Drawings made by Frederic Louis Norden in 1737 show the Sphinx's nose missing.

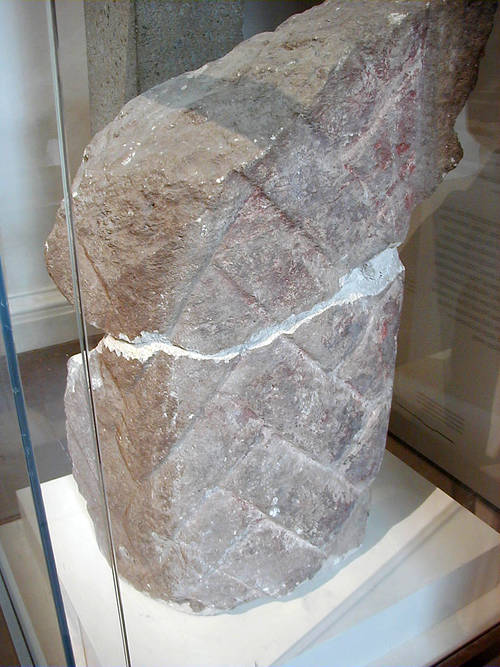
Limestone fragments of the Sphinx's beard in the British Museum, 14th century BC

=== Beard ===
During excavation, fragments of a ceremonial pharaonic beard were found between its forepaws at the base of its chest. The beard was most likely original to the construction of the Sphinx, and it broke and was reassembled at a later time, most likely during Thutmose IV's restoration. Egyptologist Vassil Dobrev suggested the beard would have damaged the chin of the statue upon falling. Residue of red pigment is visible on areas of the Sphinx's face, and traces of yellow and blue pigment have been found elsewhere on the Sphinx, leading Mark Lehner to suggest the monument "was once decked out in gaudy comic book colours".

== Holes and tunnels ==
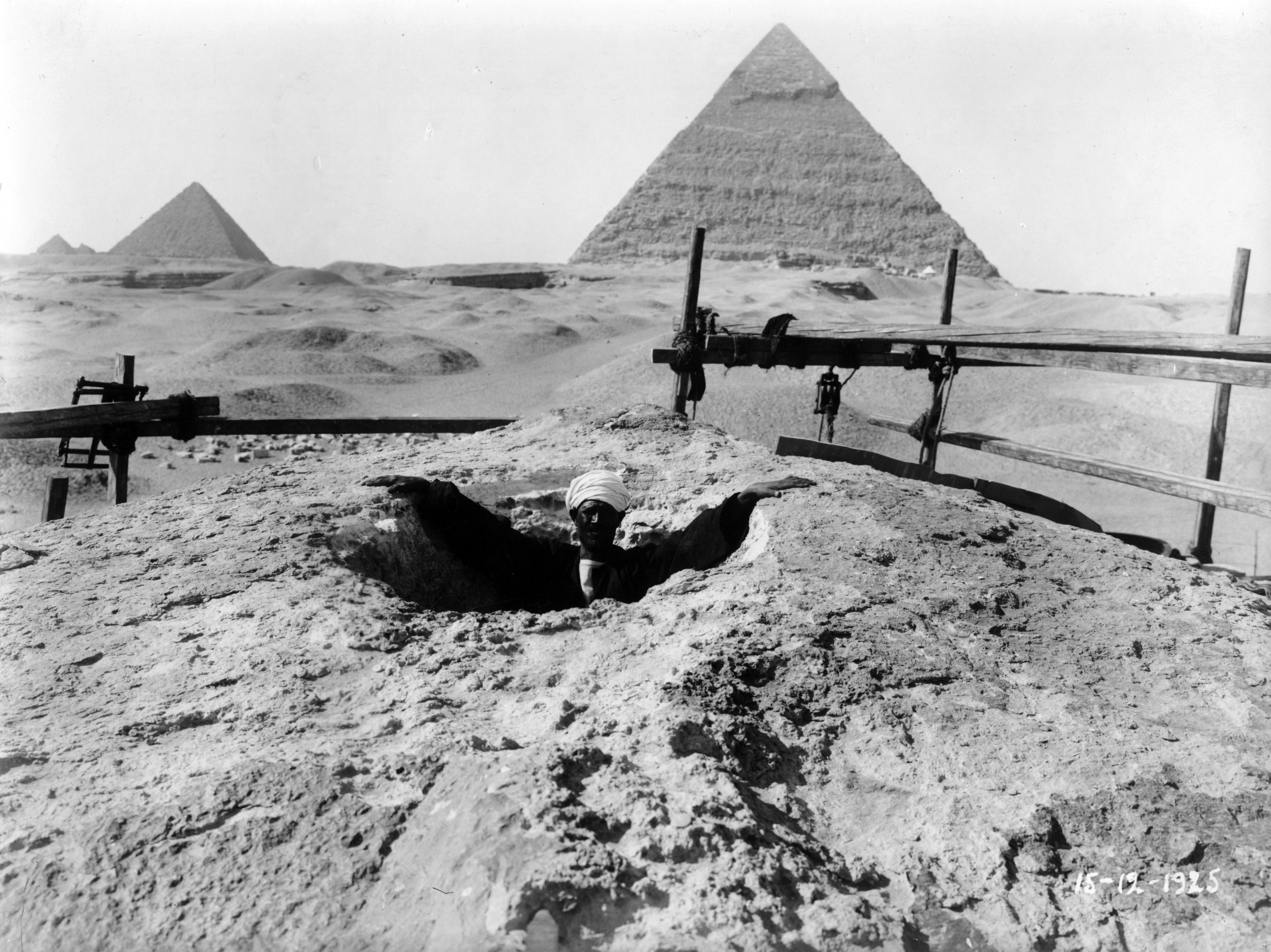
Man standing in the hole on top of the head of the Sphinx, 1925

=== Hole in the Sphinx's head ===
During his travels between 1565 and 1566, Johann Helffrich visited the Sphinx and described how a priest entered the head of the Sphinx, and when the priest spoke, it was as if the Sphinx itself was speaking. Many New Kingdom stelae depict the Sphinx wearing a crown. If it in fact existed, the hole could have been the anchoring point for it. Émile Baraize closed the hole with a metal hatch in 1926.

=== Perring's Hole ===
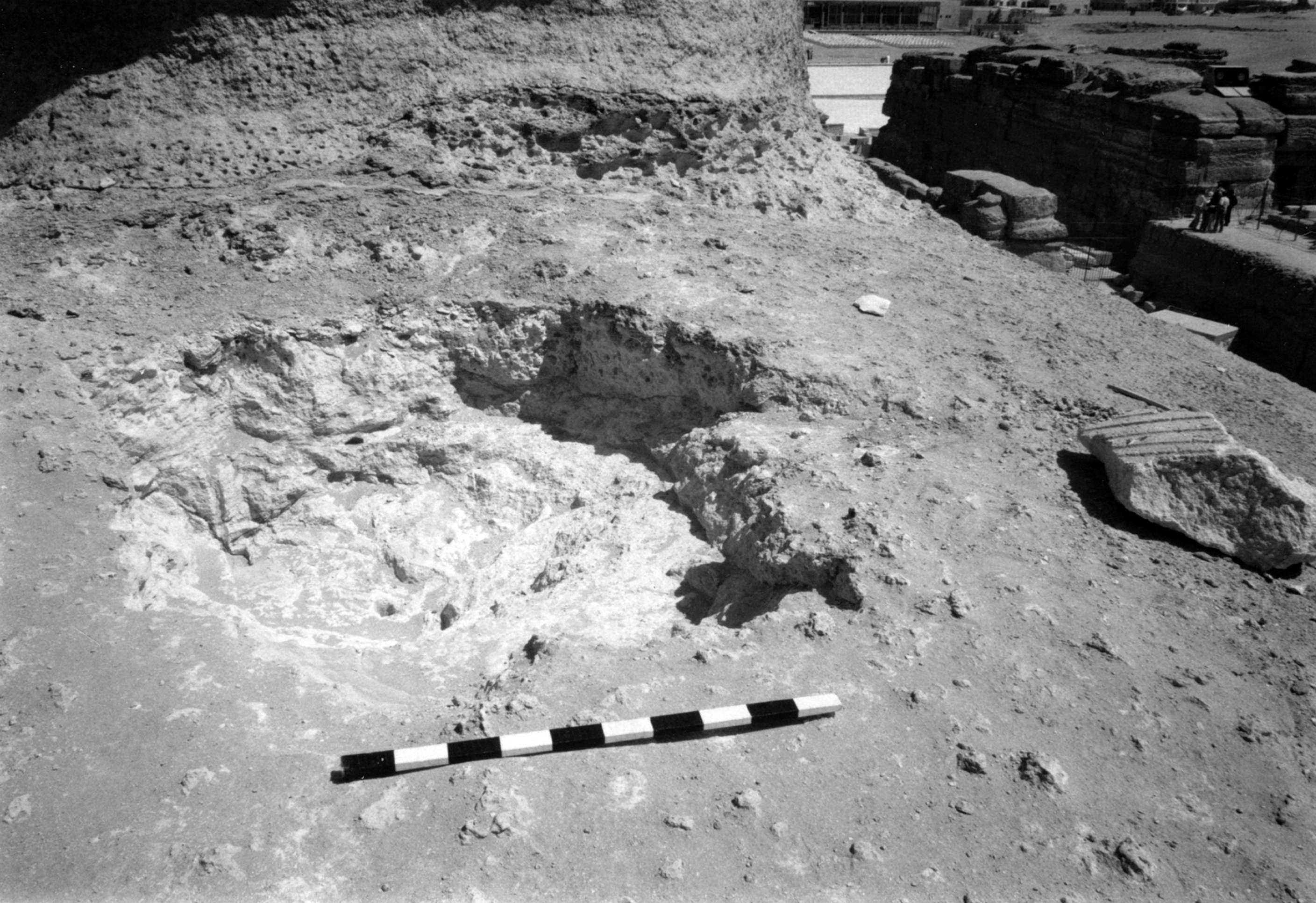
Perring's Hole behind neck of the Sphinx. Part of headdress on the right

Howard Vyse directed John Shae Perring in 1837 to drill a tunnel in the back of the Sphinx, just behind the head. The boring rods became stuck at a depth of 27 feet (8.2 m). Attempts to blast the rods free caused further damage. The hole was cleared in 1978. Among the rubble was a fragment of the Sphinx's nemes headdress.

==== Major fissure ====
A major natural fissure in the bedrock cuts through the waist of the Sphinx, first excavated by Auguste Mariette in 1853. At the top of the back it measures up to 2 metres (6.6 ft) in width. Baraize, in 1926, sealed the sides and roofed it with iron bars, limestone and cement, and installed an iron trap door at the top. The sides of the fissure might have been artificially squared; however, the bottom is irregular bedrock, about 1 metre (3.3 ft) above the outside floor. A very narrow crack continues deeper.

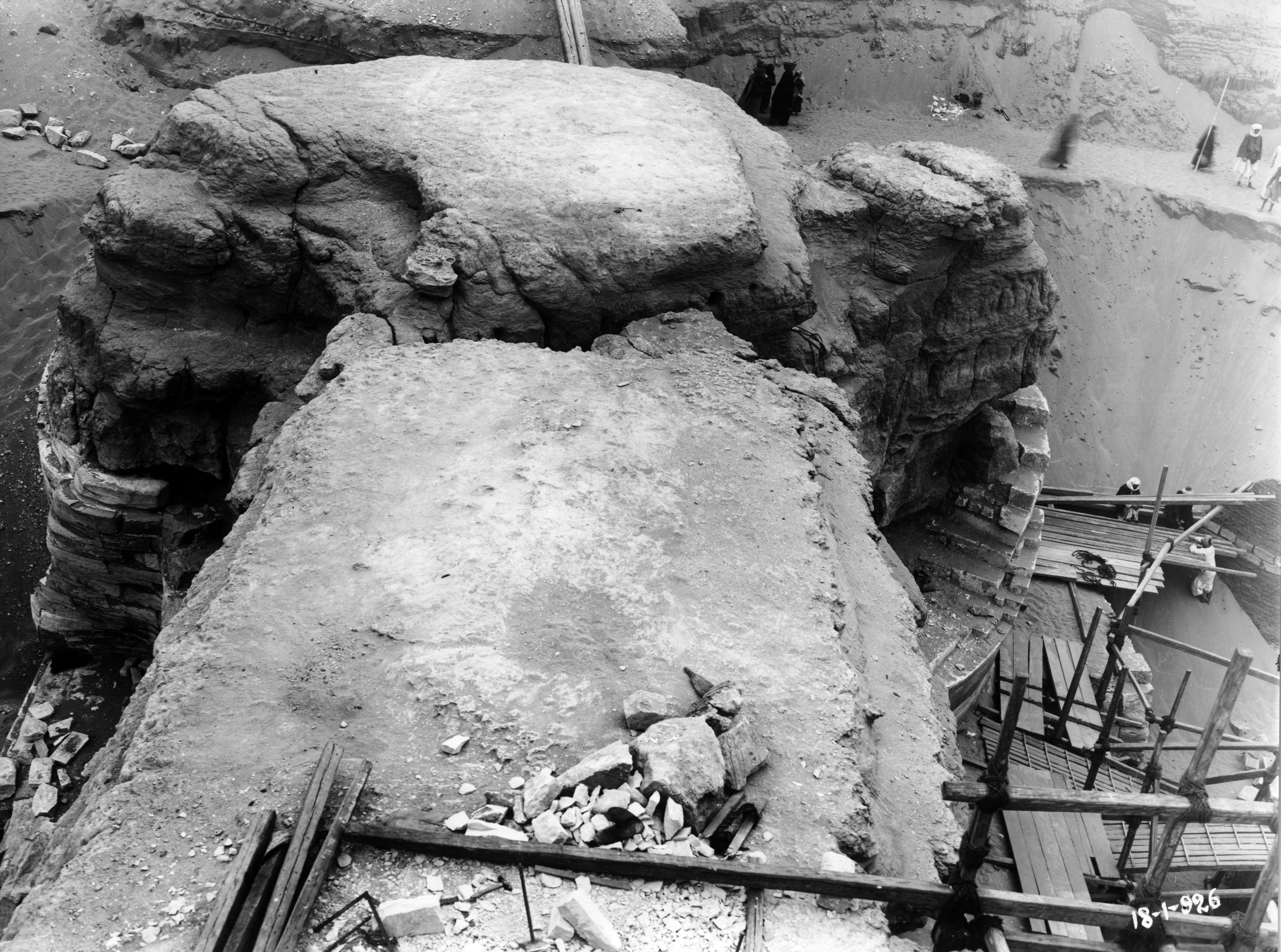
Major fissure running through the waist of the Sphinx, before modern restorations in 1926

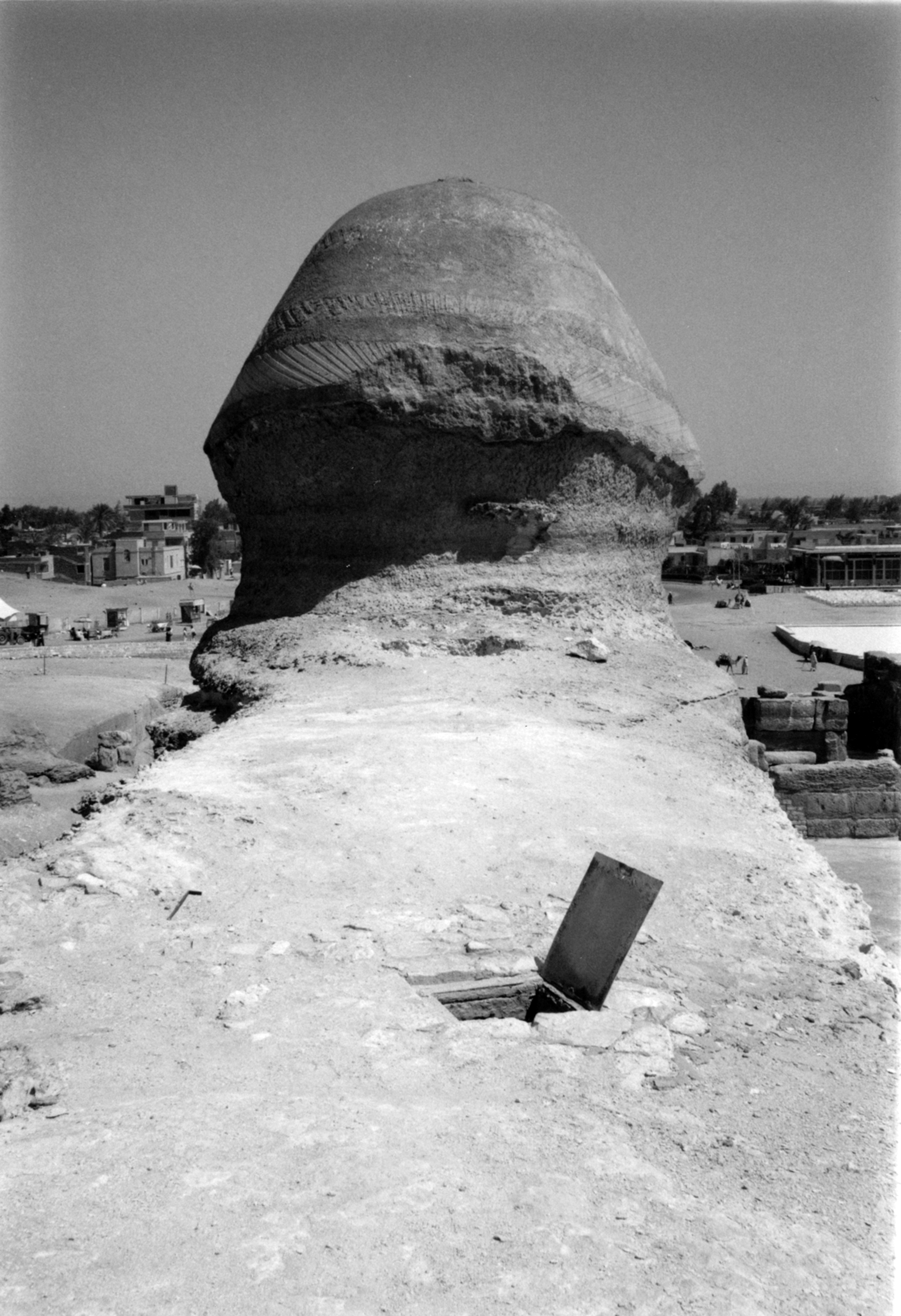
Trap-door access to major fissure, after restorations

=== Rump passage ===
In 1926, the Sphinx was cleared of sand under direction of Baraize, which revealed an opening to a tunnel at floor-level at the north side of the rump. It was subsequently closed by masonry veneer and nearly forgotten. More than 50 years later, the existence of the passage was recalled by three elderly men who had worked during the clearing as basket carriers. This led to the rediscovery and excavation of the rump passage, in 1980.

The passage consists of an upper and a lower section, which are angled roughly 90 degrees to each other:

- The upper part ascends to a height of 4 metres (13 ft) above the ground-floor at a northwest direction. It runs between masonry veneer and the core body of the Sphinx and ends in a niche 1 metre (3.3 ft) wide and 1.8 metres (5.9 ft) high. The ceiling of the niche consists of modern cement, which likely spilled down from the filling of the gap between masonry and core bedrock, some 3 metres (9.8 ft) above
- The lower part descends steeply into the bedrock toward northeast, for a distance of approximately 4 metres (13 ft) and a depth of 5 metres (16 ft). It terminated in a cul-de-sac pit at groundwater level. At the entrance it is 1.3 metres (4.3 ft) wide, narrowing to about 1.07 metres (3.5 ft) towards the end. Among the sand and stone fragments, a piece of tin foil and the base of a modern ceramic water jar was found. The clogged bottom contained modern fill. Among it, more tin foil, modern cement and a pair of shoes

It is possible the entire passage was cut top down, beginning high up on the rump, and the current access point at floor-level was made at a later date. In his diary (February 27 and 28, 1837), Vyse noted he was "boring" near the tail, which indicates him as the creator of the passage, as no other tunnel has been identified at this location. Another interpretation suggests the shaft is of ancient origin, perhaps an exploratory tunnel or an unfinished tomb shaft.

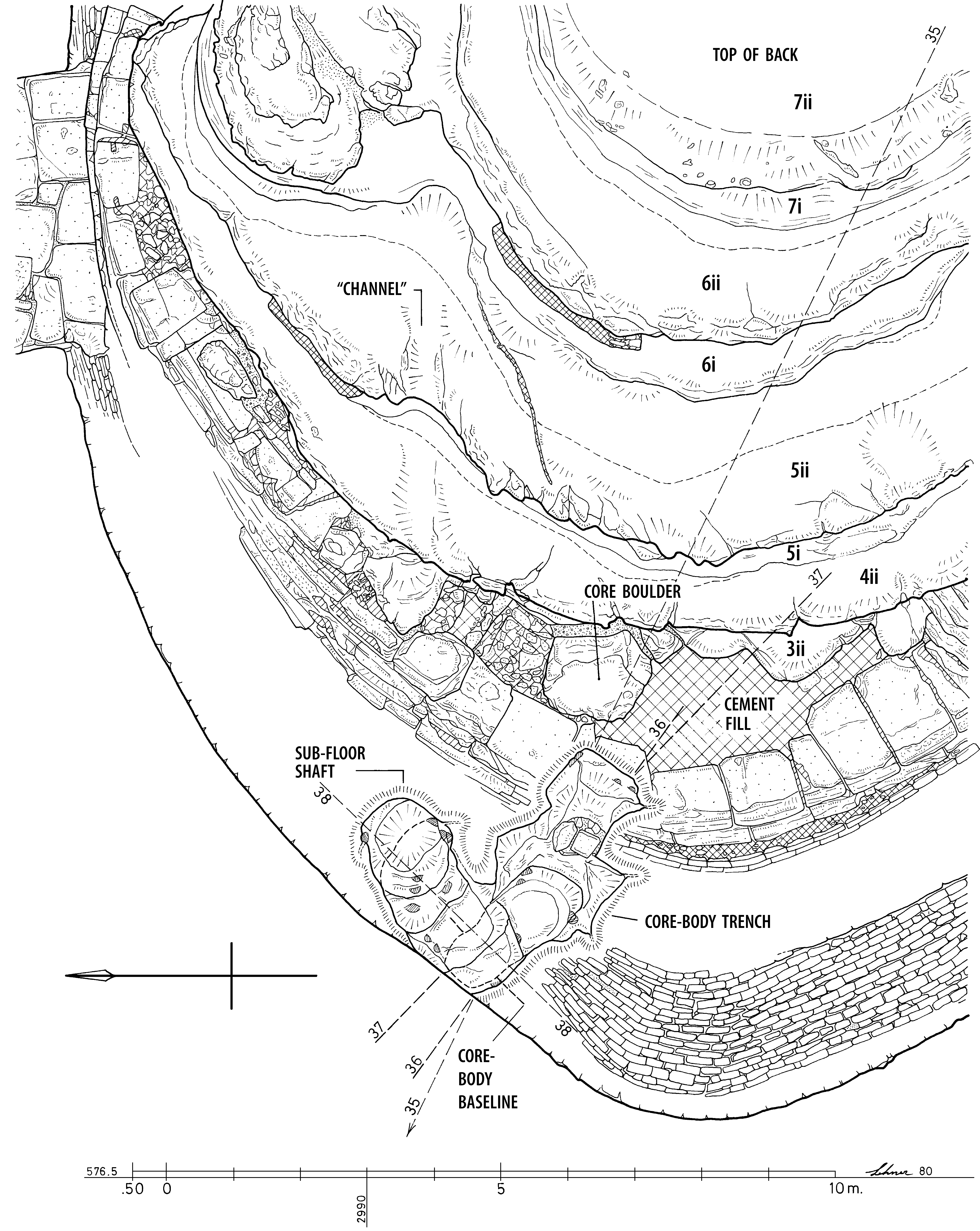
Top-down plan of the rump passage. Lower part labeled "Sub-Floor Shaft", upper part "Core-Body Trench".

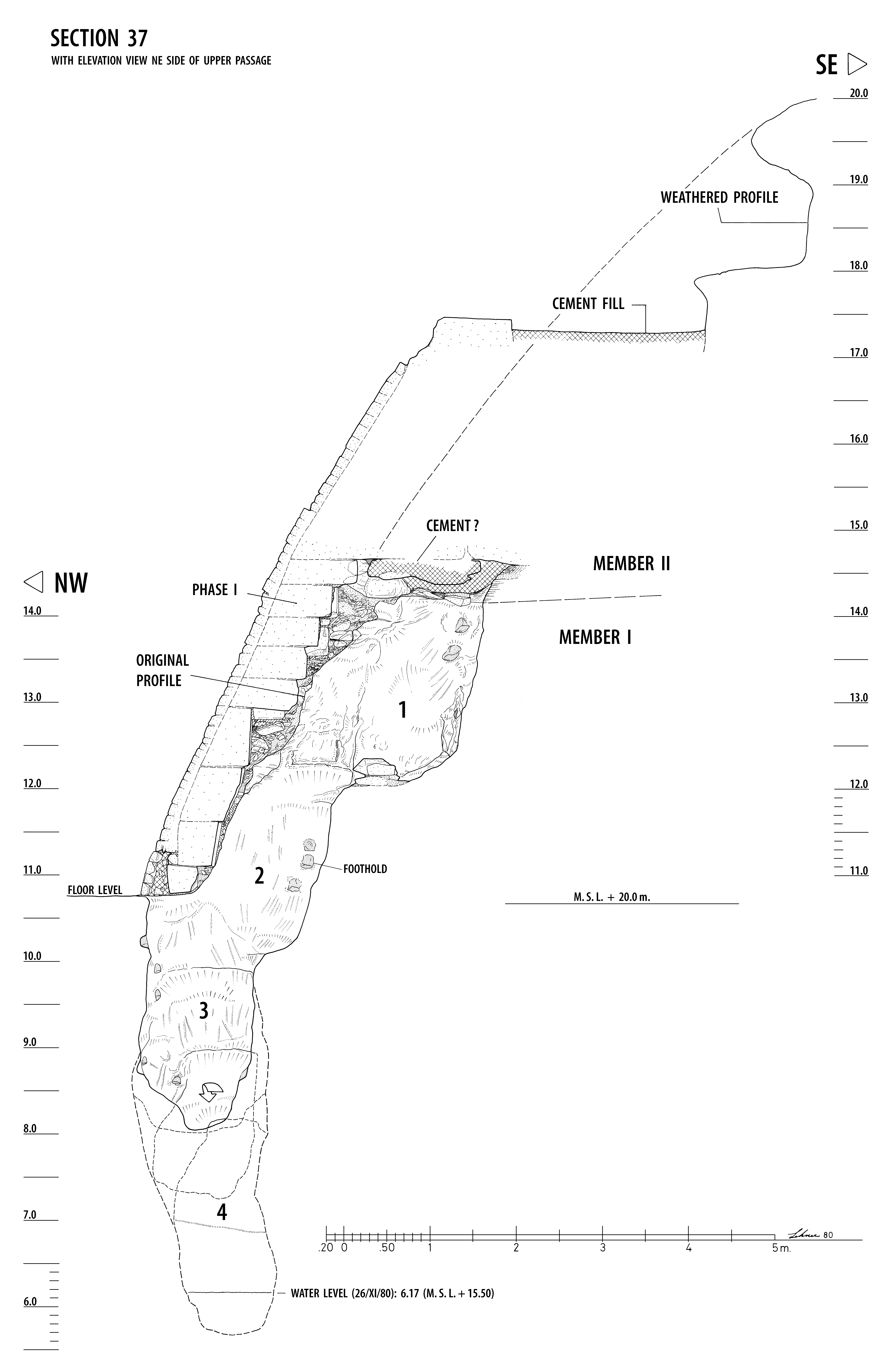
Profile of the rump passage with upper part (1+2) and lower part (3+4)

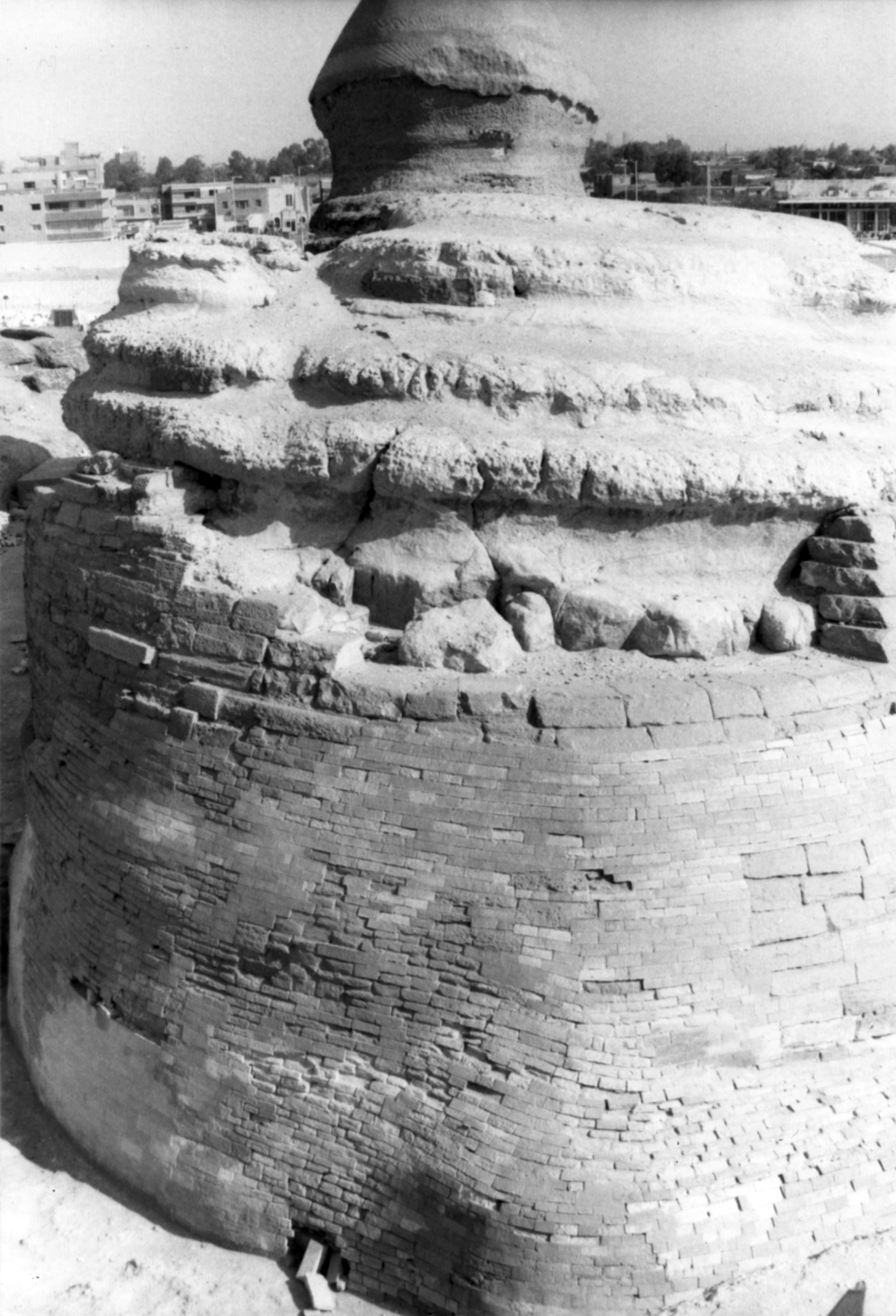
Rump of the Sphinx, with passage entrance at floor-level, c. 1980
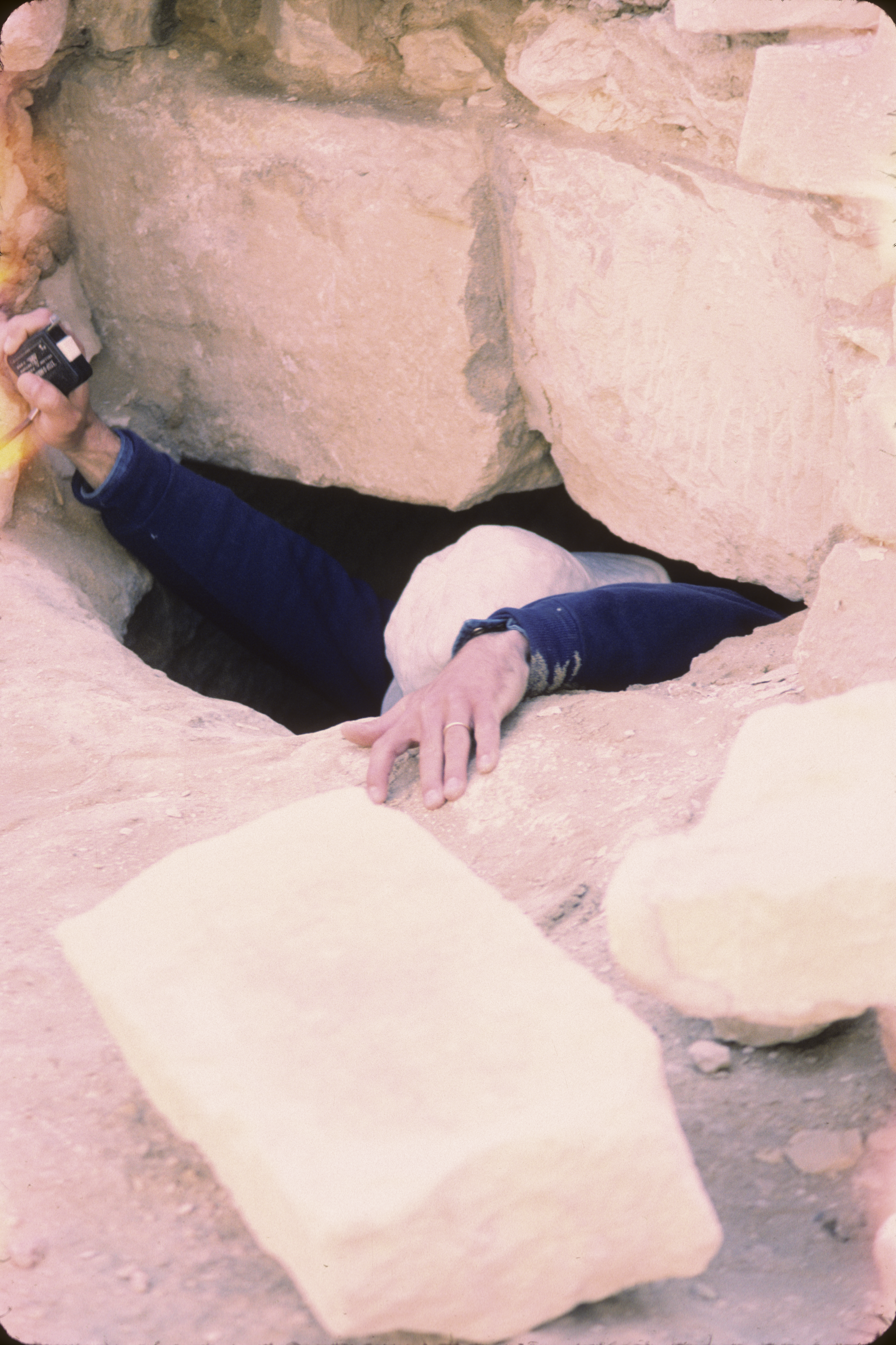
Closeup of the entrance hole of the rump shaft

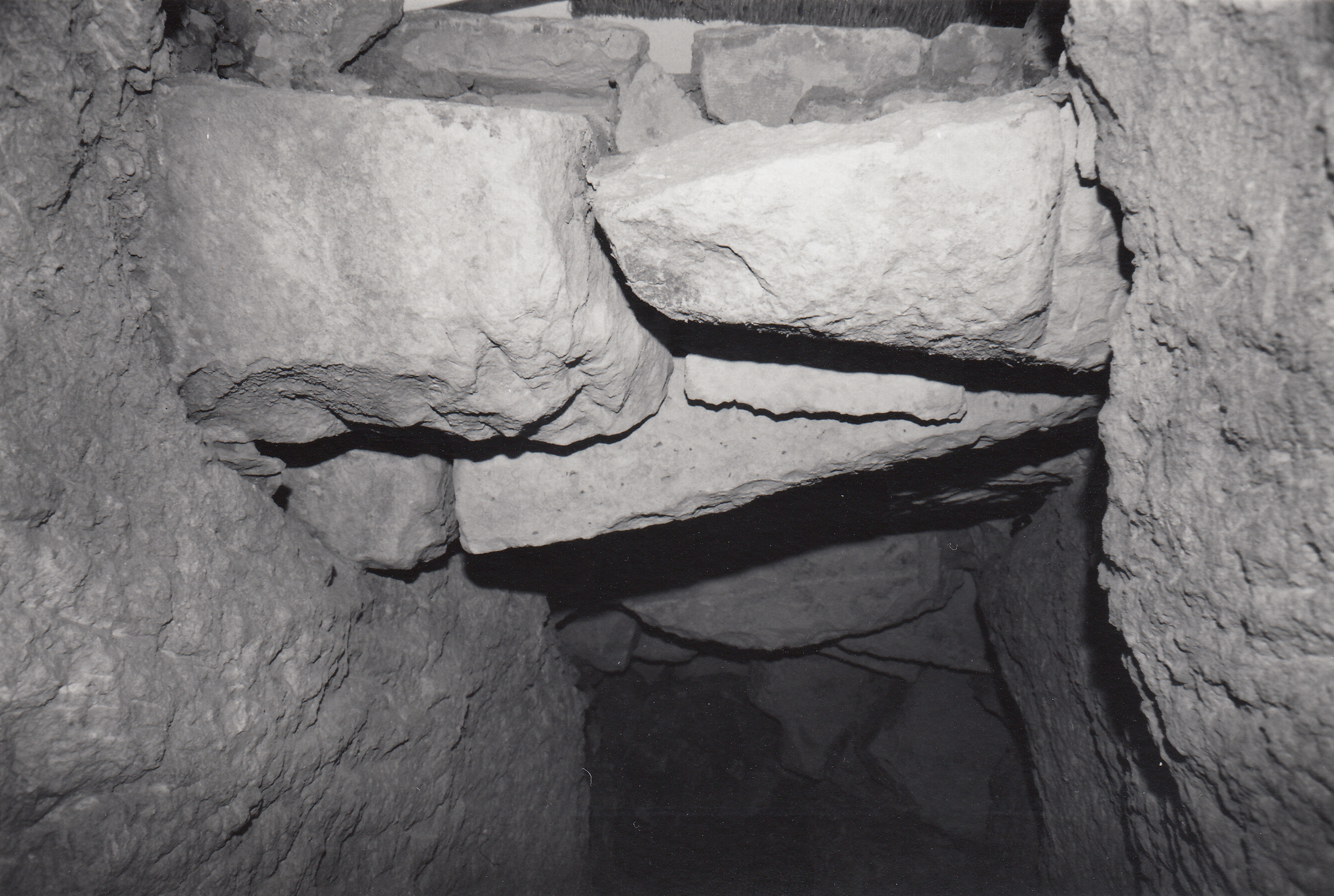
Inside the passage, looking up, seeing entrance stones and upper tunnel

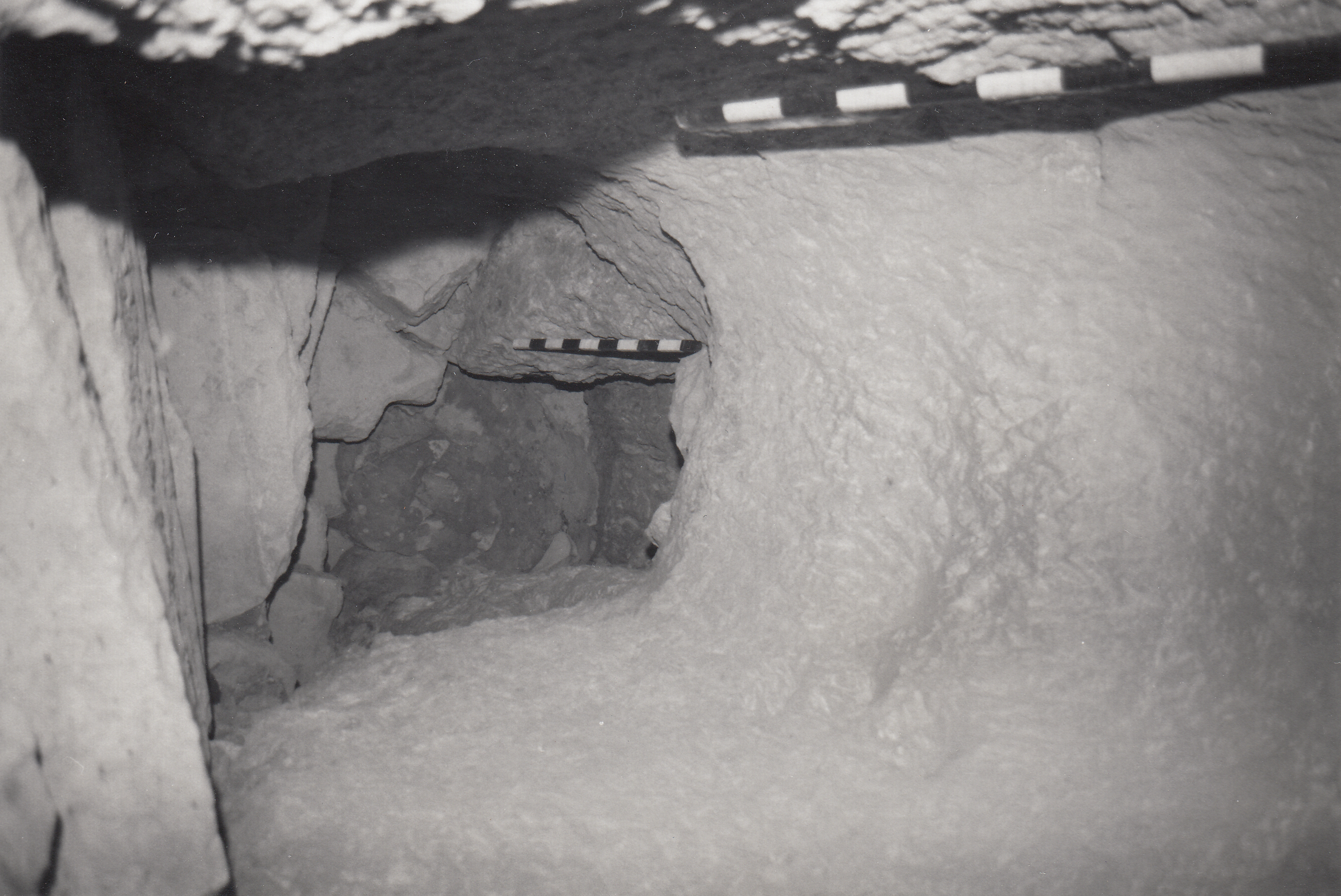
Looking up the upper tunnel

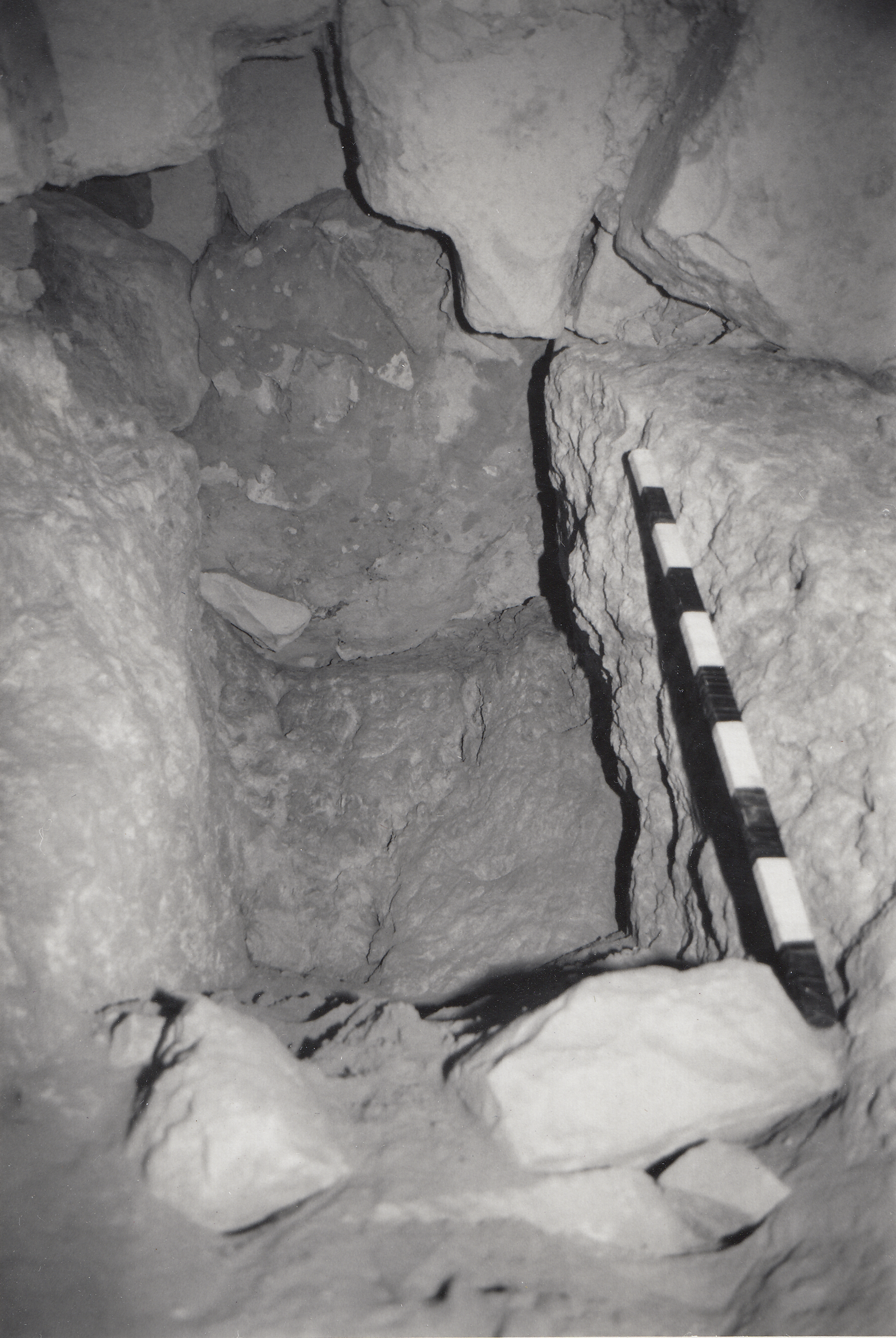
Ceiling of upper tunnel

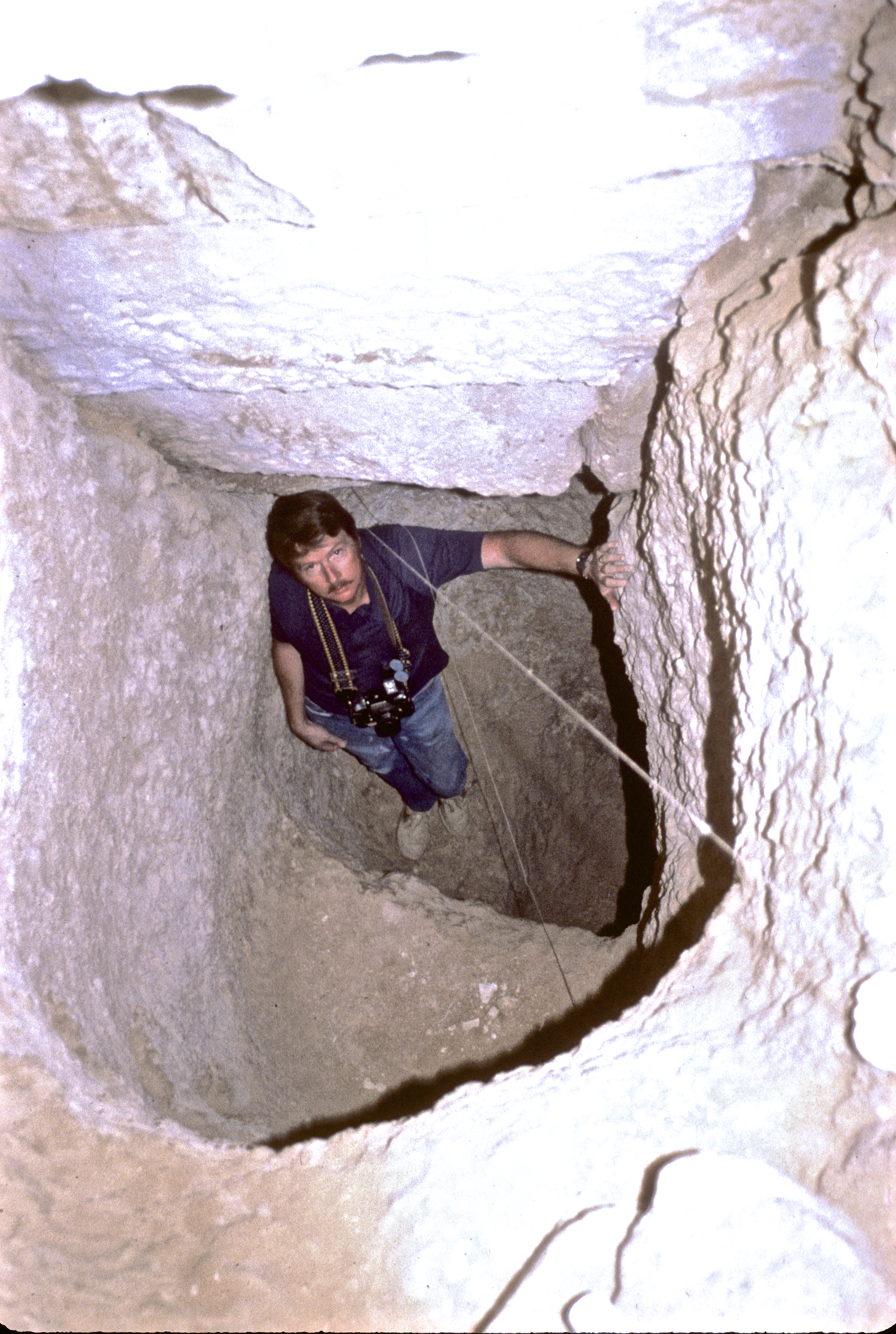
Looking down the upper part from chamber 1

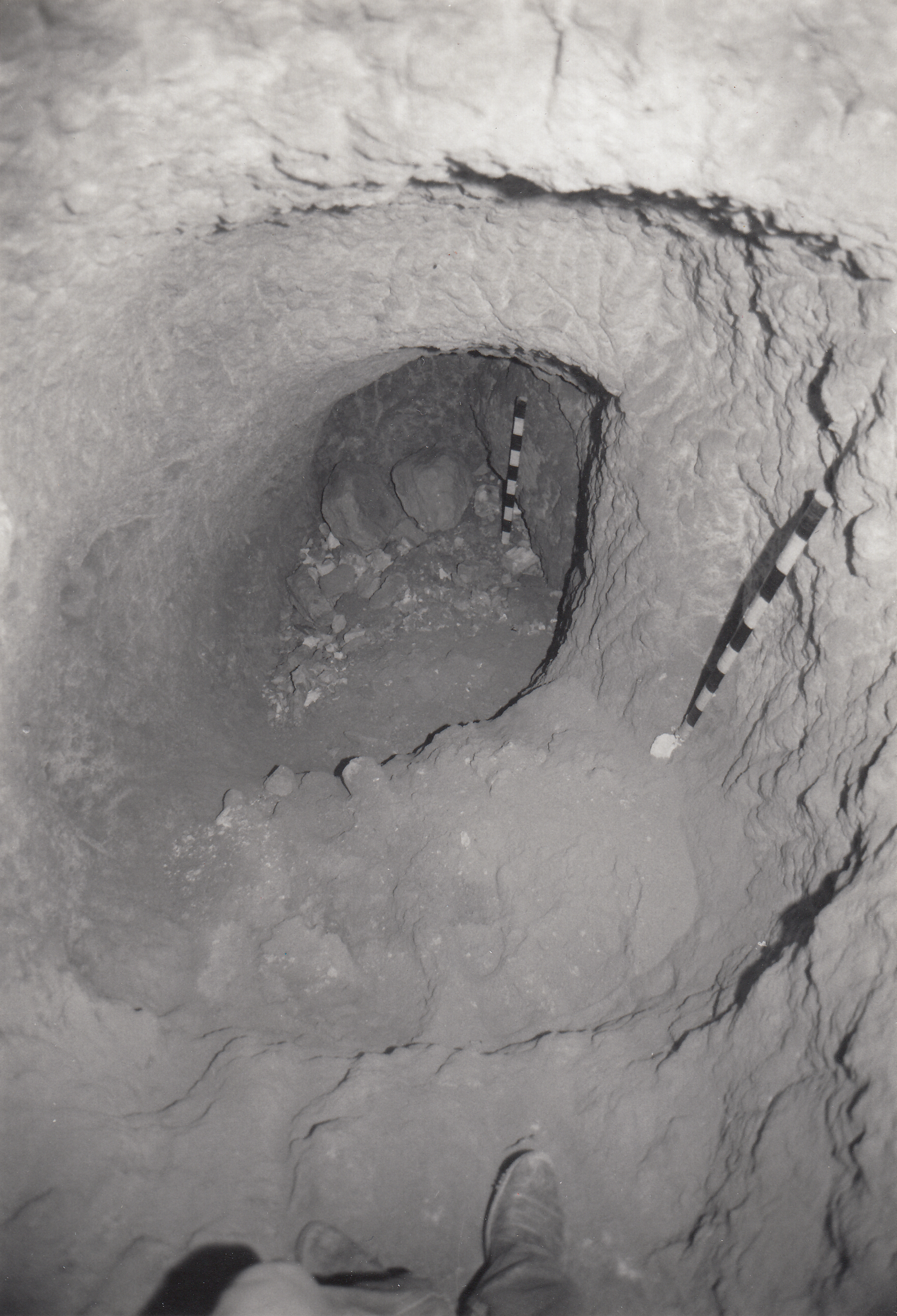
Lower part of rump passage, before excavation

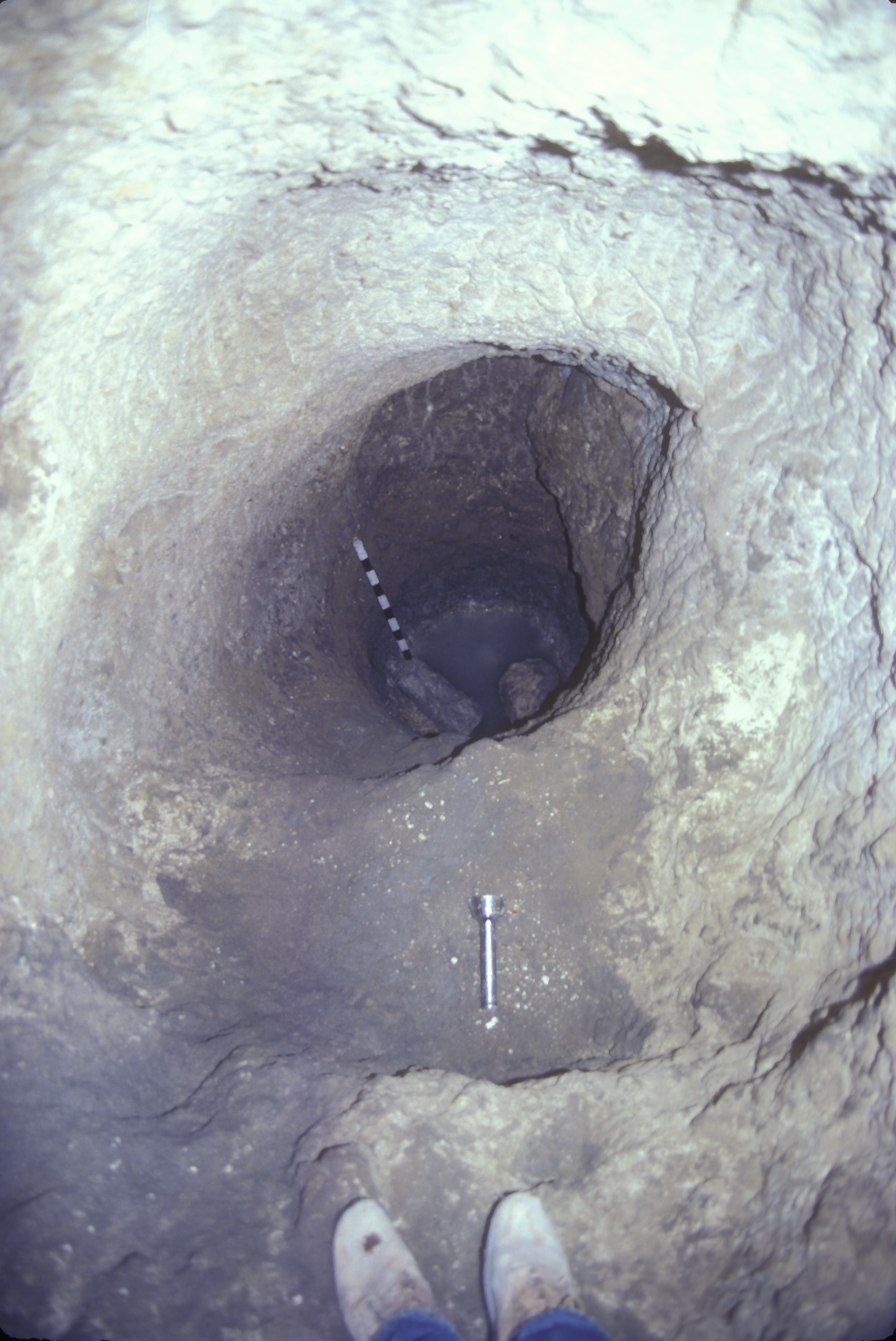
Lower part after excavation

=== Niche in northern flank ===
A 1925 photograph shows a man standing below floor level in a niche in the Sphinx's core body. It was closed during the 1925–1926 restorations.

=== Gap under southern large masonry box ===
Another hole might have been at floor level in the large masonry box on the south side of the Sphinx.

=== Space behind Dream Stele ===
The space behind the Dream Stele, between the paws of the Sphinx, was covered by an iron beam and cement roof, which was fitted with an iron trap door.

=== Keyhole Shaft ===
At the ledge of the Sphinx enclosure, a square shaft is located opposite the northern hind paw. It was cleared during excavation in 1978 by Hawass and measures 1.42 by 1.06 metres (4.7 by 3.5 ft) and about 2 metres (6.6 ft) deep. Lehner interprets the shaft to be an unfinished tomb and named it "Keyhole Shaft", because of cuttings in the ledge above the shaft shaped like the lower part of a traditional (Victorian era) keyhole, upside down.

== Pseudohistory ==
Although numerous ideas have been suggested to explain or reinterpret the origin and identity of the Sphinx, the ideas lack sufficient evidential support and/or are contradicted by such, and are therefore considered pseudohistory and pseudoarchaeology.

=== Ancient astronauts/Atlantis ===
- In accordance with the ancient Egyptian solar cult, the Sphinx faces east towards the rising sun. The Orion correlation theory posits the Sphinx was built and aligned to face the constellation of Leo during the vernal equinox around 10,500 BC. Since no textual, factual, or archaeological evidence supports the theory, the idea is considered pseudoarchaeology.
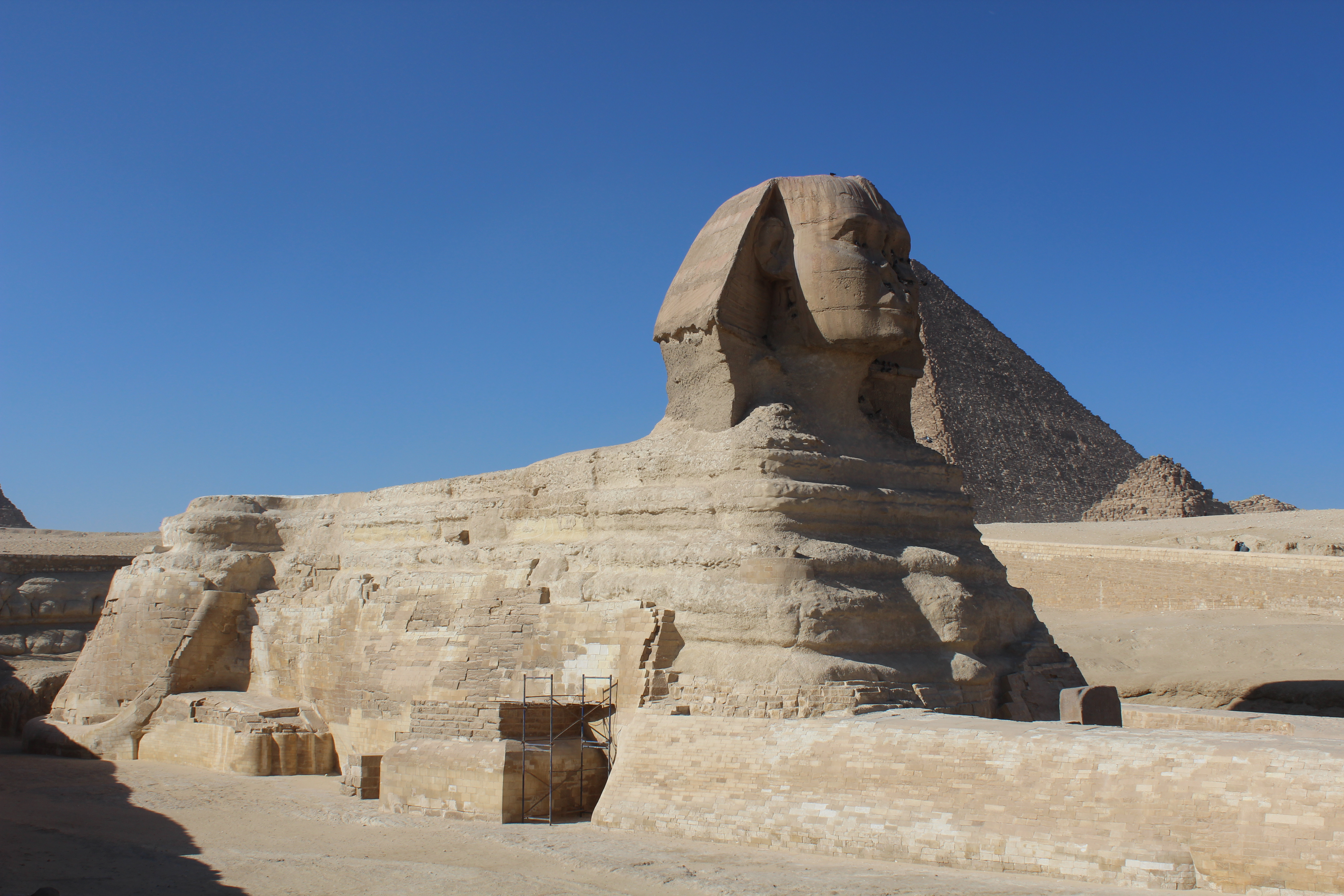
  Weathering on the Sphinx's body (north-eastern exposure), 2012
- The Sphinx water erosion hypothesis contends the main type of weathering evident on the enclosure walls of the Great Sphinx could only have been caused by prolonged and extensive rainfall, and must therefore predate the time of the pharaoh Khafre. The hypothesis was championed by René Schwaller de Lubicz, John Anthony West, and geologist Robert M. Schoch. However, due to archaeological, climatological, and geological evidence proving otherwise, the water erosion hypothesis is considered pseudoarchaeology by mainstream scholarship.
- Among others, H. Spencer Lewis made claims and speculated about hidden chambers beneath the Sphinx. In the 1930s, Edgar Cayce specifically predicted a "Hall of Records" containing knowledge from Atlantis would be discovered under the Sphinx in 1998. Cayce's prediction fueled much of the fringe speculation about the Sphinx in the 1990s, and was subsequently abandoned when the hall was not found when predicted.

=== Racial characteristics ===
Until the early 20th century, it was suggested the face of the Sphinx had "Negroid" characteristics, as part of the now outdated historical race concepts.

== Gallery ==
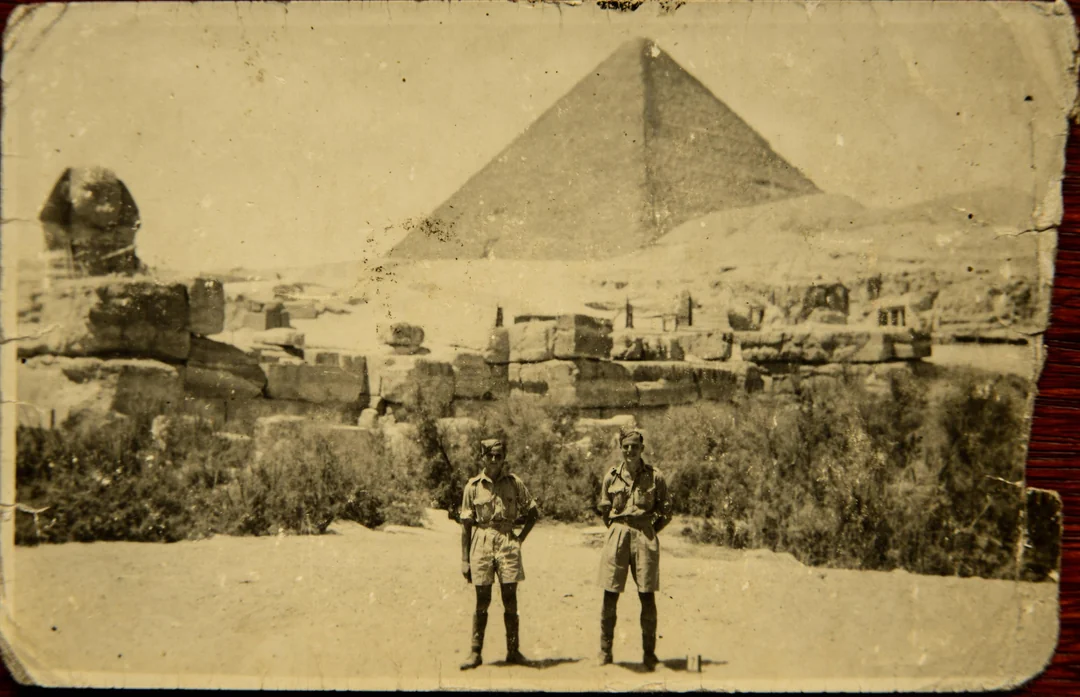
British soldiers stand next to Sphinx in late 1942 following the Battle of El Alamein

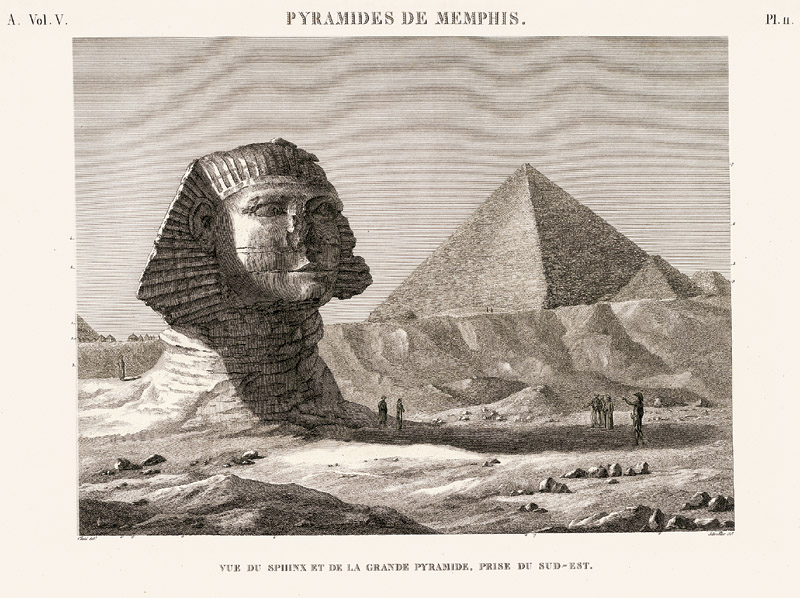
Description de l'Egypte, Planches, Antiquités, volume V (1823)

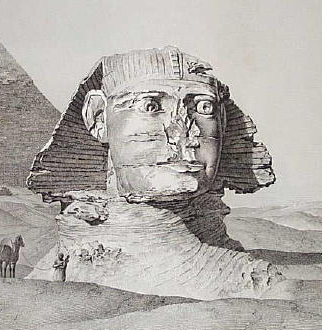
Description de l'Egypte, Planches, Antiquités, volume V (1823)

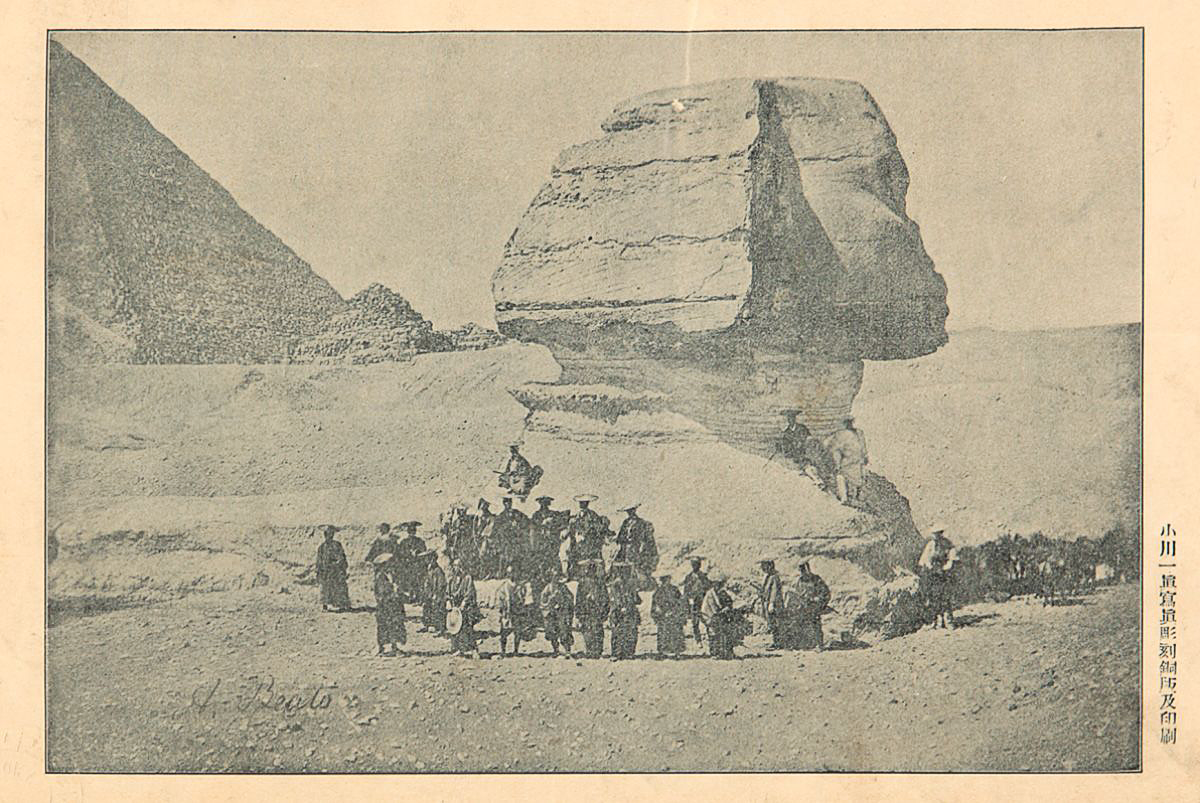
Members of the Second Japanese Embassy to Europe (1863) in front of the Sphinx, 1864

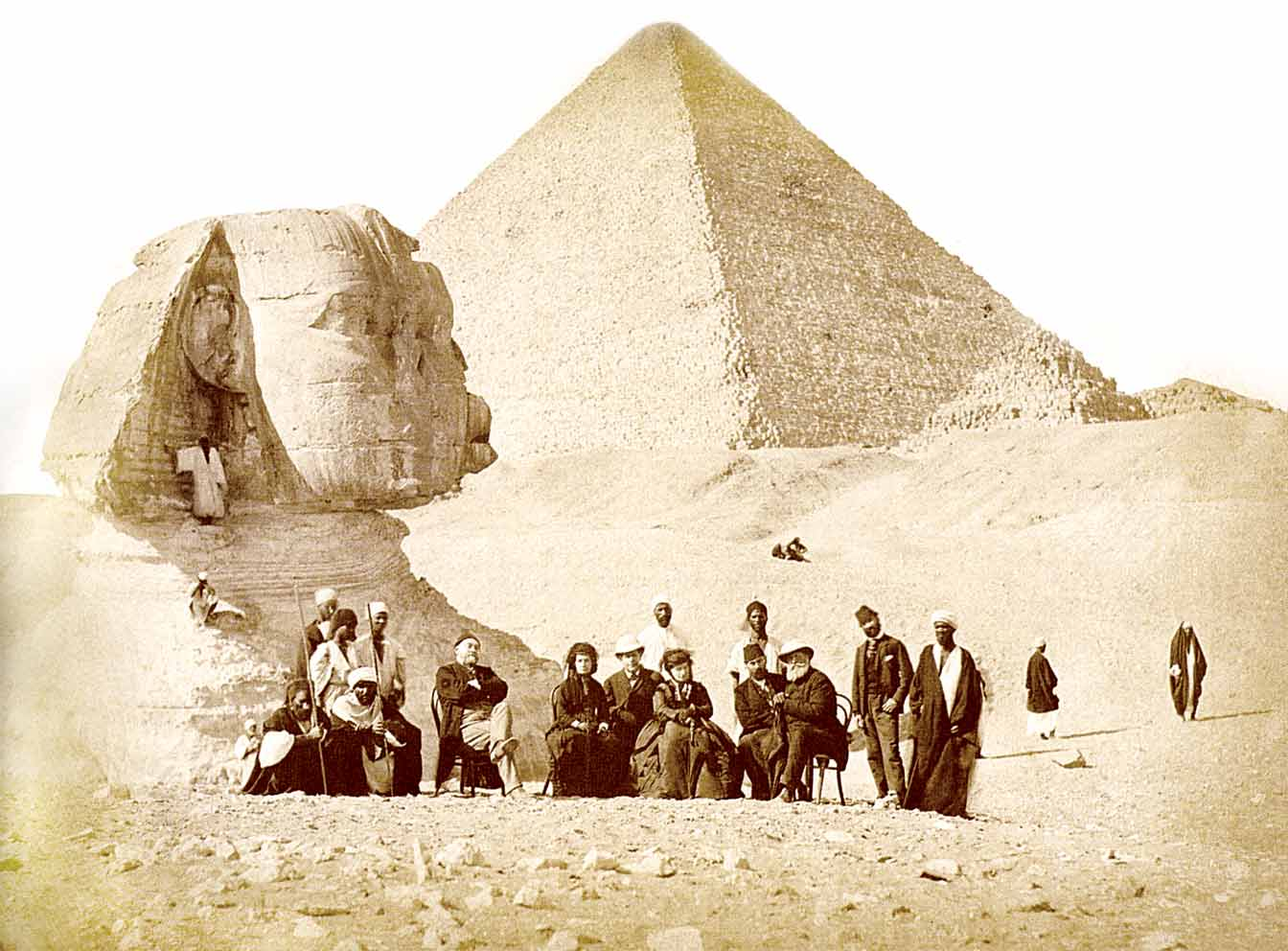
French archaeologist Auguste Mariette (seated, far left) and Emperor Pedro II of Brazil (seated, far right) with others in front of the Sphinx, 1871

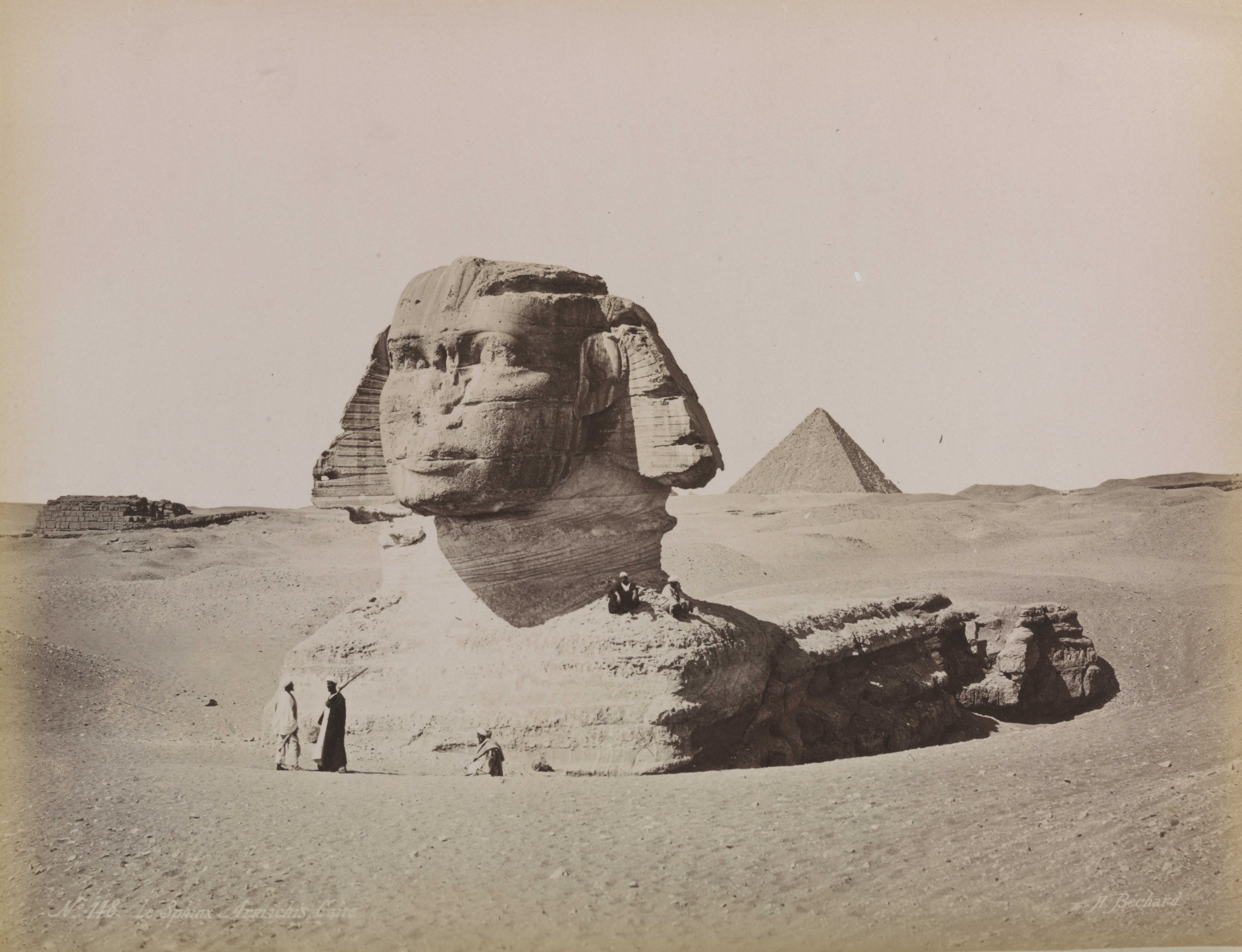
The Great Sphinx partly under the sand, c. 1880

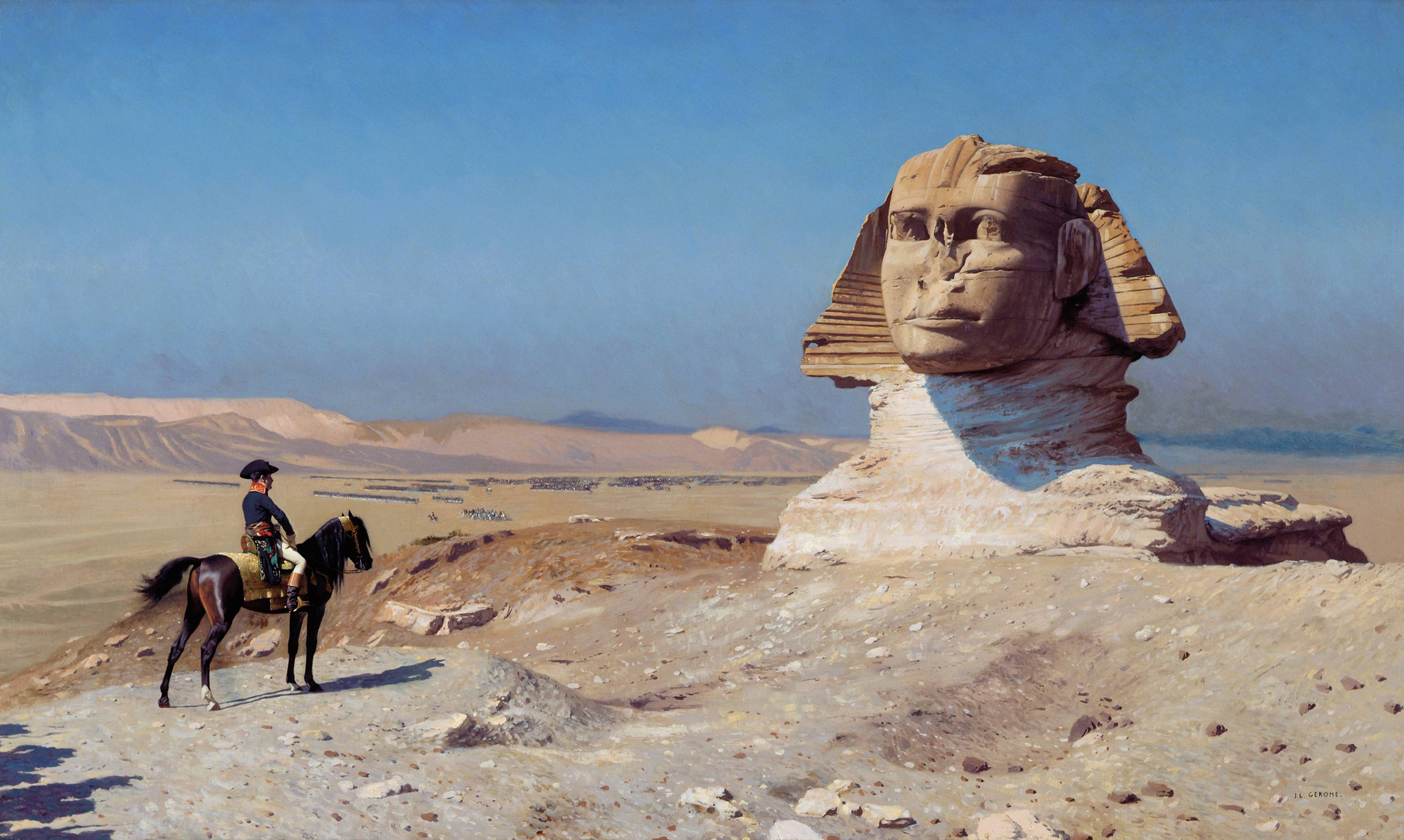
Jean-Léon Gérôme's Bonaparte Before the Sphinx, 1886

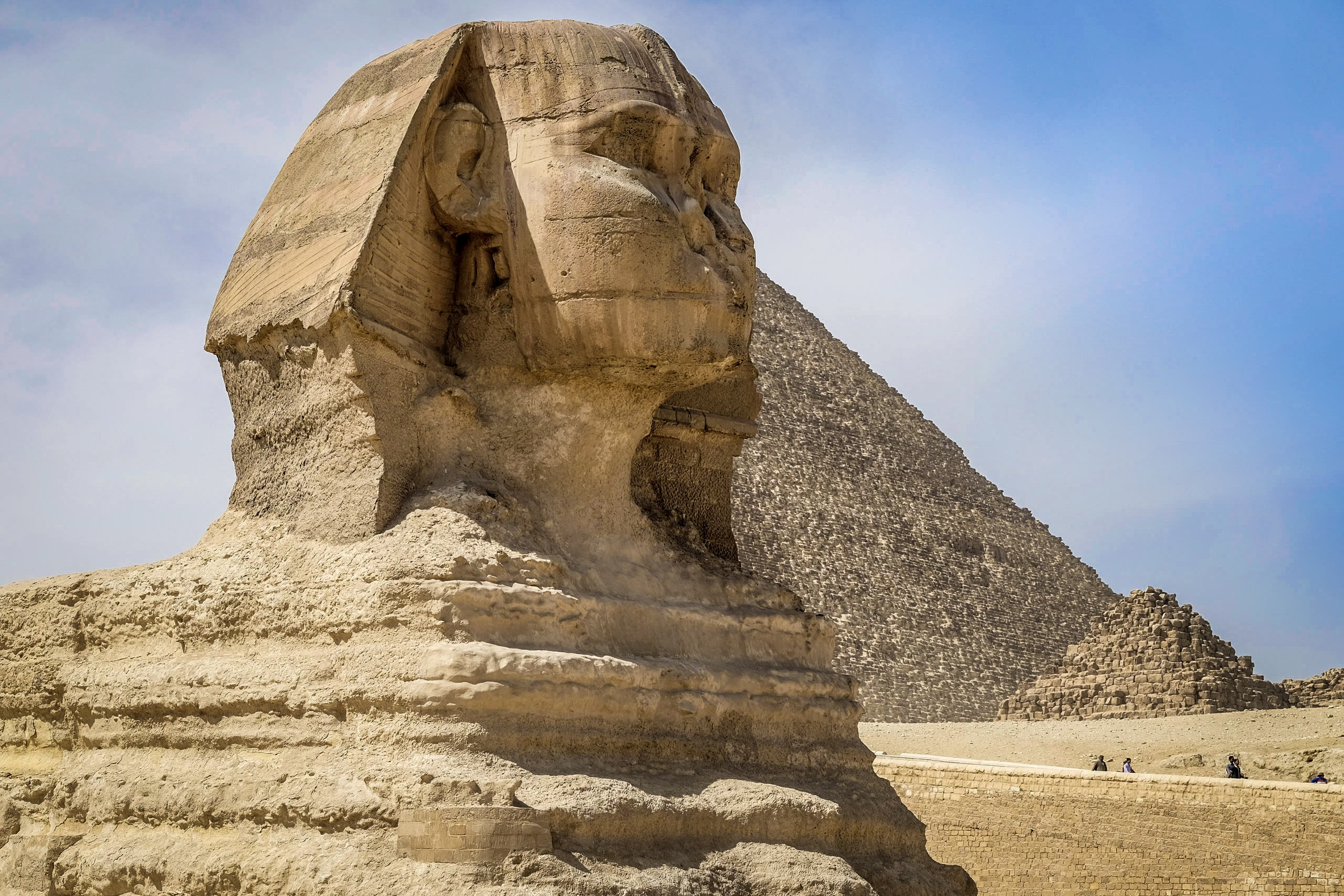
The Sphinx in profile in 2016

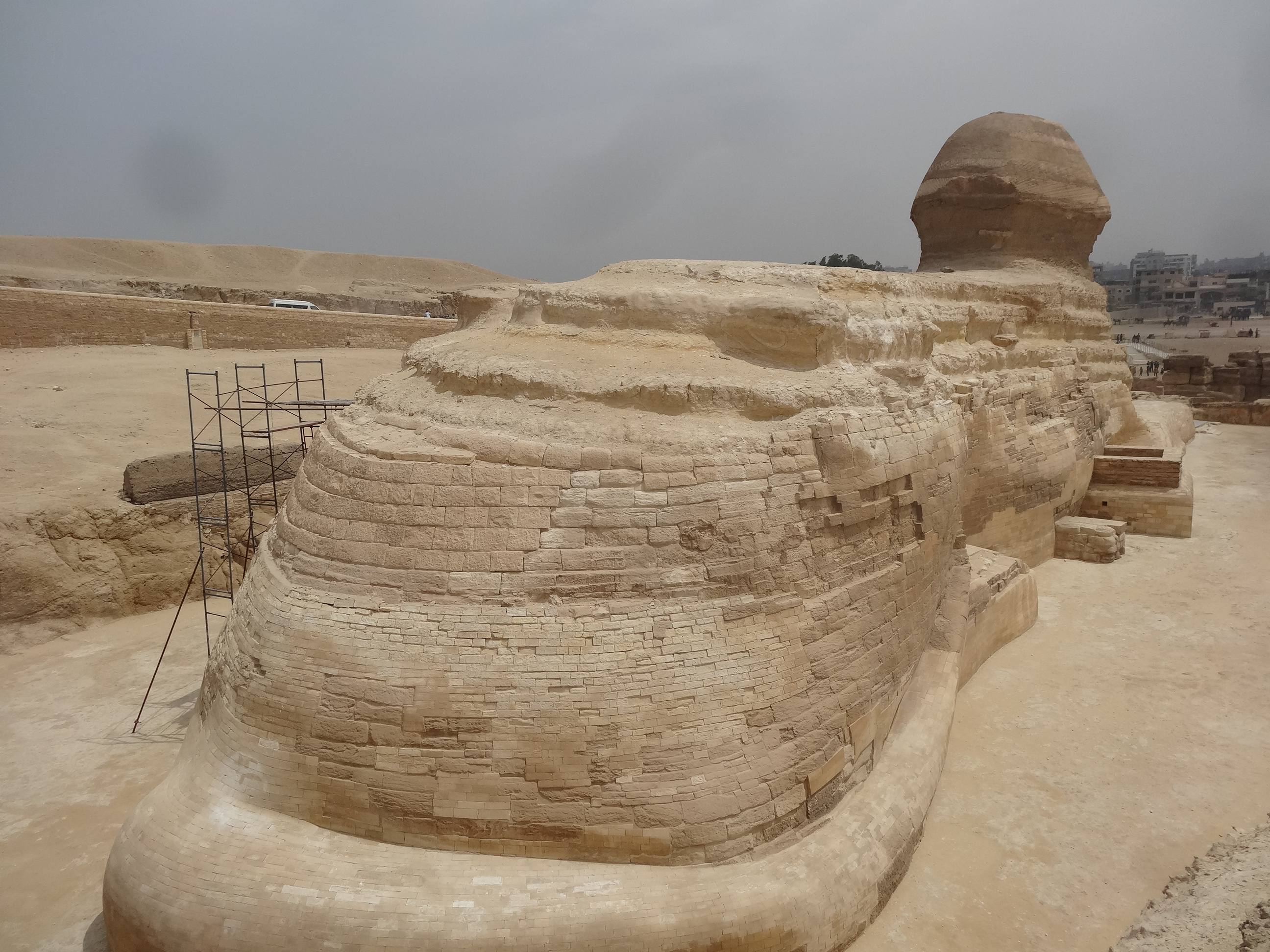
Rear view of the Sphinx in 2014, showing some of the restoration work up to that time

== See also ==
- Sphinx of Memphis
- Sphinx of Taharqo
- African lions in culture
- Lion (heraldry)
- List of colossal sculpture in situ
- List of tallest statues
