= Archaeology of ancient Egypt =

The archaeology of ancient Egypt is the study of the human history and prehistory by means of analysis of architectural sites and artifacts from those sites in Egypt. Ancient Egyptian archaeology spans from prehistory through three millennia of documented history. It focuses mainly on things such as pyramids, temples, and the material remains excavated from them. Egyptian archaeology is one of the branches of Egyptology, the study of ancient Egypt.

Ancient Egyptian civilization is thought to have emerged around 3200 BC, when land stretching from the lower Nile River and Delta was unified and ruled by a single king. Egypt was ruled through 31 dynasties of Egyptian kings, a period that lasted nearly 3,000 years. After this, Egypt became a territory of the Roman Empire following the defeat of Cleopatra VII and Marc Antony.

Napoleon's invasion of Egypt in 1798 led to the Western passion for Egyptian antiquities. In the modern era, the Ministry of State for Antiquities controls excavation permits for Egyptologists. The field can now use geophysical methods and other applications of modern sensing techniques. John Romer, Zahi Hawass, Sarah Parcak, Toby Wilkinson are some of the prominent Egyptologists making excavations in Egypt today.

== History ==
English Egyptologist William Matthew Flinders Petrie, known as the "father of Egyptian archaeology", introduced the archaeological techniques of field preservation, recording, and excavation methodology in the mid-1880s. Many highly educated amateurs also travelled to Egypt, including women such as Harriet Martineau, Headley Fellow and Florence Nightingale. In 1882, Amelia Edwards and Reginald Stuart Poole, an employee from the Department of Coins and Medals at the British Museum, decided to create the Egypt Exploration Fund as a way to raise funds for more excavations in the Nile Delta, which had rarely been visited.

=== First excavations ===
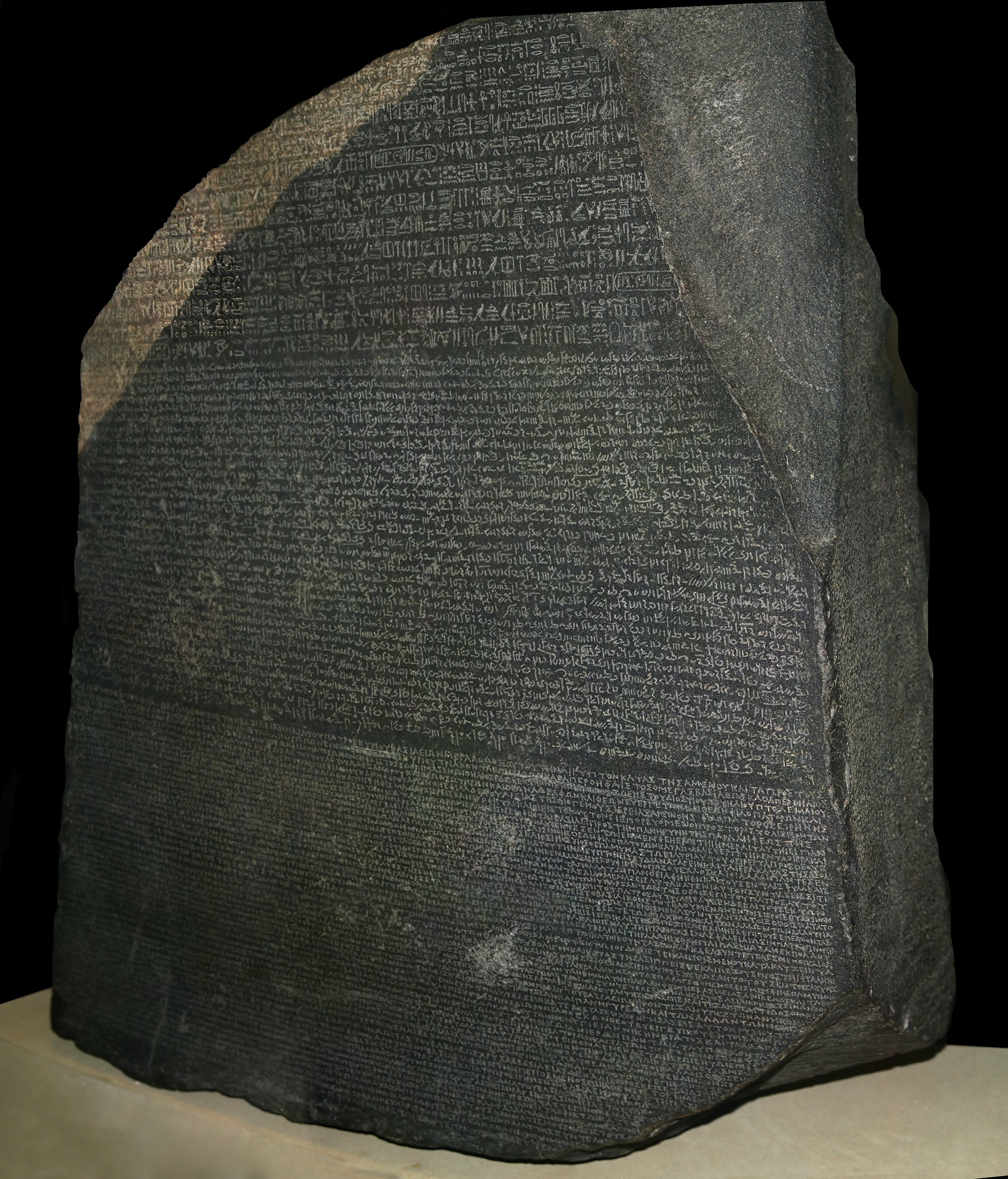
Rosetta Stone

The Rosetta Stone was discovered there in July 1799 by French officer Pierre-François Bouchard during the Napoleonic campaign in Egypt. It was the first ancient Egyptian bilingual text recovered in modern times, and it aroused widespread public interest with its potential for deciphering this previously untranslated hieroglyphic script. Jean-François Champollion later broke the code of the Rosetta Stone.

Napoleon's men tried but failed to dig up and remove the statue of Younger Memnon to France during his 1798 expedition. During this attempt that the hole on the right of the torso (just above Ramesses's right nipple) is said to have been made. In 1815, following an idea mentioned to him by his friend Johann Ludwig Burckhardt of digging up the statue and bringing it to Britain, the British consul general Henry Salt hired the adventurer Giovanni Belzoni in Cairo for this purpose. Using his hydraulics and engineering skills, he had it pulled on wooden rollers with ropes to the bank of the River Nile opposite Luxor by hundreds of workmen. However, no boat was yet available to take it up to Alexandria, so Belzoni carried out an expedition to Nubia, returning by October. With French collectors also in the area possibly looking to acquire the statue, he then sent workmen to Esna to obtain a suitable boat and in the meantime carried out further excavations in Thebes. He finally loaded the products of these digs, plus the Memnon, onto this boat and got it to Cairo by 15 December 1816. There he received and obeyed orders from Henry Salt to unload all but the Memnon, which was then sent on to Alexandria and London without him.

== Archaeological timeline ==
=== 19th century ===
The great temple of Ramesses II at Abu Simbel was discovered in 1813 by the Swiss Orientalist and traveler Johann Ludwig Burckhardt. An enormous pile of sand almost completely covered the facade and its colossal statues, blocking the entrance for four more years. The Paduan explorer Belzoni reached its interior on 4 August 1817.

A life-size sarcophagus of the 19th Dynasty Pharaoh Seti I was rediscovered in 1817 by Belzoni in the Valley of the Kings.

The 3,200-year-old Statue of Ramesses II was discovered in 1820 by Giovanni Battista Caviglia at the Great Temple of Ptah near Memphis, Egypt. The statue was found broken in six pieces and earlier attempts at restoration had failed. In 1955, Egyptian Prime Minister Gamal Abdel Nasser moved it to Bab Al-Hadid Square in Cairo.

The mummy of Seti I was discovered by Émil Brugsch on June 6, 1881, in the mummy cache (tomb DB320) at Deir el-Bahri, and since then, it has been kept at the Egyptian Museum in Cairo.

The mummy of Amenhotep II was discovered in his original sarcophagus in March 1898, by Victor Loret in the KV35 tomb in the Valley of the Kings.

=== 20th century ===
The tomb of Nefertari, QV66, was discovered by Ernesto Schiaparelli in 1904. A flight of steps cut out of the rock gives access to the antechamber, which is decorated with paintings based on chapter seventeen of the Book of the Dead. The astronomical ceiling represents the heavens and is painted in dark blue, with a myriad of golden five-pointed stars. The east wall of the antechamber is interrupted by a large opening flanked by the representation of Osiris to the left and Anubis on the right; this, in turn, leads to the side chamber, decorated with offering-scenes, preceded by a vestibule in which paintings portray Nefertari presented to the deities, who welcome her. On the north wall of the antechamber is the stairway down to the burial-chamber, a vast quadrangular room covering a surface area of about 90 square metres (970 sq ft), its astronomical ceiling supported by four pillars, entirely decorated.

The entrance to KV55 was uncovered by Edward R. Ayrton on 6 January 1907. Its discovery was brought to the attention of Theodore M. Davis the following day. The tomb was first entered on 9 January by Ayrton, Davis, Joseph Lindon Smith, and (as the representative of the antiquities service) Arthur Weigall. On 11 January 1907, the findings were photographed. Ayrton then began clearing the tomb. On 25 January 1907, the coffin and mummy were investigated in situ.

In 1921, while excavating south of the tomb, Howard Carter discovered several items that seem to have originated in KV55. These included a jasper burnisher and some fragments of copper rosettes from a funerary pall.

After a systematic search, beginning in 1915, Carter discovered the actual tomb of Tutankhamun (KV62) in November 1922. By February 1923, the antechamber had been cleared of everything but two sentinel statues. A day and time were selected to unseal the tomb with about twenty appointed witnesses that included Lord Carnarvon, several Egyptian officials, museum representatives and the staff of the Government Press Bureau. On 17 February 1923, at just after two o'clock, the seal was broken. There were 5,398 items found in the tomb, including a solid gold coffin, face mask, thrones, archery bows, trumpets, a lotus chalice, two Imiut fetishes, gold toe stalls, furniture, food, wine, sandals, and fresh linen underwear. Howard Carter spent ten years cataloging the items.

In 1954, Egyptian archaeologist Kamal el-Mallakh discovered a ship buried in pieces right beside the Great Pyramid of Khufu. It was largely built of Lebanon cedar planking in the "shell-first" construction technique, using unpegged tenons of Christ's thorn. The ship was built with a flat bottom composed of several planks, but no actual keel, with the planks and frames lashed together with Halfah grass and has been reconstructed from 1,224 pieces which had been laid in a logical, disassembled order in the pit beside the pyramid.

Though KV5 was partially excavated as early as 1825, its true extent was discovered in 1995 by Kent R. Weeks and his exploration team. It has proven to be the largest tomb in the Valley of the Kings, and originally contained the mummified remains of some of this king's estimated 52 sons. Approximately 150 corridors and tomb chambers have been located in this tomb as of 2006, and the tomb may contain as many as 200 corridors and chambers.

=== 21st century ===
In June 2000, the European Institute for Underwater Archaeology (IEASM), directed by Franck Goddio, in cooperation with the Egyptian Ministry for Antiquities discovered the ancient sunken city of Thonis-Heracleion in today's Abu Qir Bay. The statues of a colossal king and queen are on display at the Grand Egyptian Museum. Other discovered artefacts are exhibited at the Bibliotheca Alexandrina and Alexandria National Museum (ANM). The excavations are documented through several publications

In June 2011, an archaeological team led by French Egyptologists Pierre Tallet and Gregory Marouard, organized by the French Institute of Oriental Archaeology (IFAO), restarted work at the site. Among other materials, a collection of hundreds of papyrus fragments was found in 2013 dating back 4500 years. The papyrus is currently exhibited at the Egyptian Museum in Cairo. The Egyptian archaeologist Zahi Hawass called this ancient papyrus "the greatest discovery in Egypt in the 21st century".

In March 2017, the Egyptian-German team of archaeologists unearthed an eight-meter 3,000-year-old statue that included a head and a torso thought to depict Pharaoh Ramses II. According to Khaled El-Enany, the Egyptian Antiquities Minister, the statue was more likely thought to be King Psammetich I. Excavators also revealed an 80 cm-long part of a limestone statue of Pharaoh Seti II while excavating the site.

In August 2017, archaeologists from the Ministry of Antiquities announced the discovery of five mud-brick tombs at Bir esh-Shaghala, dating back nearly 2000 years. Researchers also revealed worn masks gilded with gold, several large jars and a piece of pottery with unsolved ancient Egyptian writing on it.

In November 2017(2000-10-25), the Egyptian mission in cooperation with the European Institute for Underwater Archaeology announced the discovery of three 2,000-year-old sunken shipwrecks dated back to the Roman Era in Alexandria's Abu Qir Bay.

In April 2018, the Egyptian Ministry of Antiquities announced the discovery of the head of the bust of Roman Emperor Marcus Aurelius at the Temple of Kom Ombo in Aswan during work to protect the site from groundwater.

In April 2018, the Egyptian Ministry of Antiquities announced the discovery of the shrine of the god Osiris Ptah Neb, dating back to the 25th dynasty in the Temple of Karnak in Luxor.

In July 2018, a German-Egyptian researchers' team head by Ramadan Badry Hussein of the University of Tübingen reported the discovery of an extremely rare gilded burial mask that probably dates from the Saite-Persian period in a partly damaged wooden coffin in Saqqara. The last time a similar mask was found was in 1939. The eyes were covered with obsidian, calcite, and black hued gemstones, possibly onyx. "The finding of this mask could be called a sensation. Very few masks of precious metal have been preserved to the present day, because the tombs of most Ancient Egyptian dignitaries were looted in ancient times", said Hussein.

In July 2018, archaeologists led by Zeinab Hashish announced the discovery of a 2.000-year-old 30-ton black granite sarcophagus in Alexandria. It contained three damaged skeletons in red-brown sewage water. According to archaeologist Mostafa Waziri, the skeletons looked like a family burial with a middle-aged woman and two men. Researchers also revealed a small gold artifact and three thin sheets of gold.

In September 2018, a sandstone sphinx statue was discovered at the temple of Kom Ombo in Aswan. The statue, measuring approximately 28 cm (11 in) in width and 38 cm (15 in) in height, likely dates to the Ptolemaic dynasty.

In September 2018, several dozen caches of mummies dating 2,000 years back were found in Saqqara by a team of Polish archaeologists led by Kamil Kuraszkiewicz from the Faculty of Oriental Studies of the University of Warsaw.

In November 2018, an Egyptian archaeological mission located seven ancient Egyptian tombs at the ancient necropolis of Saqqara containing a collection of scarab and cat mummies dating back to the Fifth and Sixth Dynasties. Three of the tombs were for cats, some dating back more than 6,000 years, while one of four other sarcophagi was unsealed. With the remains of cat mummies were unearthed 100 gilded and wooden statues of cats, and one in bronze, dedicated to the cat goddess Bastet. In addition, funerary items dating back to the 12th Dynasty were found beside the skeletal remains of the cats.

In November 2018, France's University of Strasbourg announced the discovery of two sarcophagi thought to be more than 3,500 years old with two perfectly preserved mummies and approximately 1,000 funerary statues in the Assasseef valley near Luxor. One of the tombs with paintings where the female body found, was opened to the public in front of the international media, but the other one was previously opened by Egyptian antiquities officials.

According to the Al-Ahram, in January 2019, archaeologists headed by Mostafa Waziri revealed a collection of 20 tombs dated back to the Second Intermediate Period in Kom Al-Khelgan. The burials contained the remains of animals, amulets, and scarabs carved from faience, round and oval pots with handholds, flint knives, broken and burned pottery. All burials included skulls and skeletons in the bending position and were not very well-preserved.

In February 2019, fifty mummy collections wrapped in linen, stone coffins or wooden sarcophagi dated back to the Ptolemaic Kingdom were discovered by Egyptian archaeologists in the Tuna el-Gebel site in Minya. Twelve of the graves in four burial chambers 9 m (30 ft) deep, belonged to children. One of the remains was the partly uncovered skull enclosed in linen. Egypt's Minister of Tourism and Antiquities announced the discovery of the collective graves of senior officials and high clergy of the god Djehuty (Thoth) in Tuna el-Gebel in January 2020. An archaeological mission headed by Mustafa Waziri reported that 20 sarcophagi and coffins of various shapes and sizes, including five sarcophagi made of limestone and carved with hieroglyphic texts, as well as 16 tombs and five well-preserved wooden coffins were unearthed by their team.

On 13 April 2019, an expedition led by a member of the Czech Institute of Egyptology, Mohamed Megahed, discovered a 4,000-year-old tomb near Egypt's Saqqara Necropolis. Archaeologists confirmed that the tomb belonged to an influential person named Khuwy, who lived in Egypt during the 5th Dynasty."The L-shaped Khuwy tomb starts with a small corridor heading downwards into an antechamber and from there a larger chamber with painted reliefs depicting the tomb owner seated at an offerings table", reported Megahed. Some paintings maintained their brightness over a long time in the tomb. Mainly made of white limestone bricks, the tomb had a tunnel entrance generally typical for pyramids. Archaeologists say that there might be a connection between Khuwy and pharaoh because the mausoleum was found near the pyramid of Egyptian Pharaoh Djedkare Isesi, who ruled during that time.

Archaeologists discovered 35 mummified remains of Egyptians in a tomb in Aswan in April 2019. Italian archaeologist Patrizia Piacentini, professor of Egyptology at the University of Milan, and Khaled El-Enany, the Egyptian minister of antiquities reported that the tomb where the remains of ancient men, women and children were found, dates back to the Greco-Roman period between 332 BC and 395 AD. While the findings assumed belonging to a mother and a child were well preserved, others had suffered major destruction. Beside the mummies, artefacts including painted funerary masks, vases of bitumen used in mummification, pottery and wooden figurines were revealed. Thanks to the hieroglyphics on the tomb, it was detected that the tomb belongs to a tradesman named Tjit.

In July 2019, ancient granite columns and a smaller Greek temple, treasure-laden ships, along with bronze coins from the reign of Ptolemy II, pottery dating back to the third and fourth centuries BC were found at the sunken city of Heracleion. The investigations were conducted by Egyptian and European divers led by underwater archaeologist Franck Goddio. They also uncovered the ruins of the city's main temple off of Egypt's north coast.

In September 2019, archaeologists announced the discovery of a 2,200-year-old temple believed to belong to the Ptolemy IV Philosopher of the Ptolemaic Kingdom in Kom Shakau village of Tama township. Researchers also revealed limestone walls carved with inscriptions of Hapi, the Nile god, and inscriptions with fragments of text featuring the name of Ptolemy IV.

In October 2019, Egyptian archaeologists headed by Zahi Hawass revealed an ancient "industrial area" used to manufacture decorative artefacts, furniture and pottery for royal tombs in Luxor's Valley of the Monkeys. The site contained a big kiln to fire ceramics and 30 ateliers. According to Zahi Hawass, each atelier had a different aim – some of them were used to make pottery, others used to produce gold artefacts and others still to churn out furniture. About 75 meters below the valley, several items believed to have adorned wooden royal coffins, such as inlaid beads, silver rings and gold foil were unearthed. Some artefacts depicted the wings of deity Horus.

In October 2019, the Egyptian archaeological mission unearthed thirty well-preserved wooden coffins (3,000-year-old) in front of the Mortuary Temple of Hatshepsut in El-Assasif Cemetery. The coffins contained mummies of twenty-three adult males, five adult females and two children, who are believed to be from the middle class. According to Hawass, mummies were decorated with mixed carvings and designs, including scenes from Egyptian gods, hieroglyphs, and the Book of the Dead, a series of spells that allowed the soul to navigate in the afterlife. Some of the coffins had the names of the dead engraved on them.

In January 2020, Egypt's Ministry of Antiquities announced the discovery of 16 tombs of high priests of the god Djehuty with about 20 sarcophagi and 5 well-preserved wooden coffins at Al-Ghoreifa area in Tuna el-Gebel, dating back to the 26th Dynasty.

Five of the anthropoid sarcophagi made of limestone and inlaid with hieroglyphic inscriptions were discovered, along with over 10,000 ushabti figurines made from blue and green faience. Some of these coffins were decorated with the names and titles of their owners. Additionally, more than 700 amulets of various shapes, sizes, and materials were uncovered, including heart scarabs, amulets of gods, and pure gold amulets like a "Ba" and a cobra with wings.

One of the stone sarcophagi is believed to have belonged to the son of Psamtik, who held the position of head of the royal treasury. The second sarcophagus is attributed to Horus and features a depiction of the goddess Nut spreading her wings across the chest, with inscriptions below indicating the deceased's titles, including that of royal treasurer. The fifth sarcophagus also contains hieroglyphic inscriptions detailing the deceased's surnames.

According to the Egypt's Ministry of Antiquities, in February, 2020, Egyptian archaeologists uncovered 83 tombs dating back to 4,000 B.C. known as the Naqada III period. Various small pottery pots in different shapes and some sea shells, makeup tools, eyeliner pots, and jewels were also revealed in the burial.

In May 2020, an Egyptian-Spanish archaeological mission headed by Esther Ponce uncovered a unique cemetery dating back to the 26th Dynasty (the so-called El-Sawi era) at the site of ancient Oxyrhynchus. Archaeologists found tombstones, bronze coins, small crosses, and clay seals inside eight Roman-era tombs with domed and unmarked roofs.

In July 2020, archaeologists headed by Dr Kathleen Martínez announced the discovery of 2 high-status mummy burials who lived at the time of Cleopatra at Taposiris Magna. As a result of the X-ray analysis, individuals were identified as a male and female.

In September 2020, 27 sealed wooden sarcophagi buried more than 2,500 years BC were discovered inside a newly located well at the sacred necropolis of Saqqara.

On 3 October 2020, Khalid el-Anany, Egypt's tourism and antiquities minister announced the discovery of at least 59 sealed sarcophagi with mummies more than 2,600 years old in Saqqara. Archaeologists also revealed the 20 statues of Ptah-Soker and a carved 35-centimeter tall bronze statue of the god Nefertem.

In October 2020, archaeologists announced the discovery of the sarcophagus of Djehuty Imhotep, a 26th Dynasty high priest along with amulets and scarab figurines in Al-Ghoreifa archaeological site in Minya.

On 19 October 2020, the Ministry of Tourism and Antiquities announced the discovery of more than 2,500 years worth of colorful, sealed sarcophagi in Saqqara. The archaeological team unearthed gilded, wooden statues and more than 80 coffins.

In November, 2020, archaeologists unearthed more than 100 delicately painted wooden coffins and 40 funeral statues. The sealed, wooden coffins, some containing mummies, date as far back as 2,500 years. Other artifacts discovered include funeral masks, canopic jars and amulets. According to Khaled el-Anany, tourism and antiquities minister, the items date back to the Ptolemaic dynasty. One of the coffins was opened and a mummy was scanned with an X-ray, determining it was most likely a man about the age of 40.

In January 2021, the tourism and antiquities ministry announced the discovery of more than 50 wooden sarcophagi in 52 burial shafts which date back to the New Kingdom period and a 13 ft-long papyrus that contains texts from the Book of the Dead. Archaeologists led by Zahi Hawass also found the funerary temple of Naert and warehouses made of bricks in Saqqara.

In January 2021, Egyptian-Dominican researchers led by Kathleen Martínez announced the discovery of 2,000-year-old ancient tombs with golden tongues dating to the Greek and Roman periods at Taposiris Magna. The team also unearthed gold leaf amulets in the form of tongues placed for speaking with the god Osiris in the afterlife. The mummies were depicted in different forms: one of them was wearing a crown, decorated with horns, and the cobra snake at the forehead. The other was depicted with gilded decorations, representing the wide necklace.

In February 2021, archaeologists from the Egyptian Ministry of Tourism and Antiquities announced the discovery of a Ptolemaic period temple, a Roman fort, an early Coptic church and an inscription written in hieratic script at an archaeological site called Shiha Fort in Aswan. According to Mostafa Waziri, the crumbling temple was decorated with palm leaf carvings and an incomplete sandstone panel that described a Roman emperor. According to researcher Abdel Badie, generally, the church with about 2.1 meters width contained an oven that was used to bake pottery, four rooms, a long hall, stairs, and stone tiles.

In March 2021, during a 3rd excavation campaign at the Tal Ganoub Qasr al-Agouz site in Egypt's Bahariya Oasis, Christian monastic structures built from basalt rock or carved into the rock face, active in the 5th century AD, were discovered by a French-Norwegian team led by Victor Ghica. According to the Egyptian Ministry of Antiquities, the structure includes the ruins of three churches and monks' cells, whose walls are decorated with Greek religious inscriptions and biblical passages.

In April 2021, Egyptian archaeologists announced the discovery of 110 burial tombs at the Koum el-Khulgan archaeological site in the Dakahlia Governorate. Sixty-eight oval-shaped tombs of them dated back to the Predynastic Period and 37 rectangular-shaped tombs were from Second Intermediate Period. The rest of them dated back to the Naqada III period. The tombs also contained the remains of adults and a baby (buried in a jar), a group of ovens, stoves, remnants of mud-brick foundations, funerary equipment, cylindrical, pear-shaped vessels and a bowl with geometric designs.

In June 2021, archaeologists announced the discovery of the stele, which describes the military campaigns of pharaoh Apries, dating back to the 26th dynasty in Ismailia.

In September 2021, archaeologists announced the discovery of ritualistic tools used in religious rituals at the ancient site of Tel al-Fara in the Kafr El-Sheikh Governorate. Remains included a limestone pillar depicting the goddess Hathor, and some incense burners with the head of the god Horus. Dr. Hossam Ghanim, said: "The mission also discovered a huge building of polished limestone from the inside, representing a well for holy water used in daily rituals".

In April 2022, an Egyptian archaeological expedition discovered an ancient Roman pottery workshop at the Tibet-Matrouh site, west of Alexandria.

In May 2022, the discovery of the nearly 4,300-year-old tomb of an ancient Egyptian high-ranked person who handled royal, sealed documents of pharaoh was announced at Saqqara. According to University of Warsaw's Polish Centre of Mediterranean Archaeology, the elaborately decorated tomb belonged to a man named Mehtjetju who served as a priest and an inspector of the royal property. Kamil O. Kuraszkiewicz, expedition director stated that Mehtjetju most likely lived at about the same time, at some point during the reigns of the first three rulers of the Sixth Dynasty: Teti, Userkare and Pepy I.

In June 2022, archaeologists from the Cairo Ministry of Antiquities announced the discovery of an alabaster bust of Alexander the Great as well as molds and other materials for creating amulets for warriors and for statues of Alexander the Great.

In July 2022, archaeologists from the Prague's Charles University, led by Dr Marslav Barta, discovered the robbed tomb of an ancient Egyptian military official named Wahibre merry Neith. They also discovered a scarab in Giza's Abusir necropolis, located 12 km (7.5 mi) southeast of the Pyramids of Giza. Wahibre commanded battalions of non-local soldiers and lived in the late 26th dynasty and early 27th dynasty, around 500 BC, according to the Egyptian Antiquities Ministry. The tomb's main well was about 6 m (20 ft) deep and it was divided into separate parts by narrow bridges cut into the natural rock. Inside the main well there was a smaller and deeper shaft which contained two sarcophagi one inside the other where Wahibre-merry-Neith was buried. The external sarcophagus was made of white limestone while the internal coffin was made out of basalt rock measures 2.30 meters long and 1.98 meters wide. The inner sarcophagus contained an inscription from the 72nd chapter of the Egyptian Book of the Dead, said Dr Marslav Barta.

In August 2022, archaeologists from the Polish Academy of Sciences in Warsaw announced the discovery of a 4,500-year-old temple dedicated to the Egyptian sun god Ra. The recently discovered sun temple was made from mud bricks and was about 60 meters long by 20 meters wide. According to Massimiliano Nuzzolo, co-director of the excavation, storage rooms and other rooms may have been served for cultic purposes and the walls of the building were all plastered in black and white. The L-shaped entrance portico had two limestone columns and was partly made of white limestone. Dozens of well-preserved beer jars and several well-made and red-lined vessels, seal impressions, including seals of the pharaohs who ruled during the fifth and sixth dynasties were also uncovered. One of the earliest seals might belonged to pharaoh Shepseskare, who ruled Egypt before Nyuserre.

In January 2023, Zahi Hawass announced the discovery of four tombs at Saqqara including a 4,300-year-old mummy to a man named Hekashepes covered with gold, in addition to finds date back to the 5th and 6th dynasties, such as a priest inspector named Khnumdjedef, secret keeper called Meri and a judge and writer named Fetek.

In February 2023, archaeologists from Barcelona University announced the discovery of 16 individual tombs from the Coptic-Byzantine period and 6 funerary complex from the Roman and Persian eras at the Al-Bahnasa archaeological site in Minya. Several of the remains discovered within the tombs were wrapped in elaborate shrouds. Two frogs put inside two jars were among the offerings.

In March 2023, a Polish archaeology team announced the discovery of the ancient Egyptian hieroglyphs inscribed on sandstone blocks in Old Dongola in Sudan.

In March 2023, archaeologists from the Ain Shams University led by Dr Mamdouh El Damaty announced the discovery of a Roman-era sphinx during the excavation at the lower level of the Dendera Temple complex in Qena. The sphinx is depicted wearing a nemes, a princely headcloth used by pharaohs to represent their authority. An Uraeus, an Egyptian cobra motif, is shown above the head as a sign of sovereignty, majesty, and divine power.

In March 2023, the researchers from the Egyptian Ministry of Tourism and Antiquities with University of Tübingen announced the discovery of the celestial reliefs depicting the heavens with the signs of zodiac during re-coloring works in the Temple of Esna. Numerous species, such as a snake with a ram's head, a bird with a crocodile's head, a snake's tail and four wings, and representations of snakes and crocodiles were also uncovered by archaeologists.

In March 2023, German-Egyptian archaeological team announced the new discoveries from the Matriya Sun Temple with a number of quartzite stone from the time of Horemheb and the traces of flooring made from mudbrick and white ash in Heliopolis.

In March 2023, ancient Egyptian hieroglyphs inscribed on sandstone blocks were discovered in Old Dongola, Sudan, by the Polish Centre of Mediterranean Archaeology University of Warsaw. Egyptologist Dr. Dawid F. Wieczorek identified them as components originating from a pharaonic temple, dating back to the first half of the first millennium BCE, which corresponds to the reign of the Twenty-fifth Dynasty of Egypt.

In April 2023, archaeologists from the Leiden Museum and Egyptian Museum announced the discovery of the elite tomb of the noble named Panehsy from the 19th Dynasty with mudbrick walls and offering bearers.

In October 2023, the Ministry of Tourism and Antiquities in Egypt announced the discovery of a cemetery in the al-Gurifa archaeological area at Tuna el-Gebel, dated back to the New Kingdom, containing sarcophagi, canopic jars, ushabtis, among other items, including a 15-metre-long Book of the Dead papyrus. Notably, the mummies belonged to a high royal official "Jehutymes", and "Nani", a female singer in the temple of Amun.

In March 2024, the top half of a statue of Ramesses II was found in an archaeological site at the ancient city of Hermopolis, now Al-Ashmunin. The 12.5-metre-long piece of limestone matches the lower part of a statue discovered in 1930. The statue portrays Ramses II seated, wearing a crown and a headdress with a cobra on top, as reported by the Egyptian Ministry of Tourism and Antiquities. Archaeologists note that hieroglyphs on the upper part of the statue's back column detail Ramses' numerous titles and the dual crown signifies Ramses' joint rule over Upper and Lower Egypt, and the cobra symbolizes royalty.

In April 2024, a rock-cut tomb dating back to the Second Dynasty was uncovered in Saqqara by a team of Japanese and Egyptian archaeologists. The tomb contained artifacts from various periods, spanning over the Late Period, the Ptolemaic period, and the 18th Dynasty. Among the findings were remains of an adult with a colored mask and a small child, in addition to two terracotta statues depicting Isis and Harpocrates.

In May 2024, an Egyptian-Japanese archaeological team has discovered a pair of underground structures near the Great Pyramid of Giza. Using ground-penetrating radar and electrical resistivity tomography, they identified a shallow L-shaped structure measuring 10 meters wide by 15 meters long.

In July 2024, a joint French-Egyptian archaeological mission from the Supreme Council of Antiquities and Paul Valéry University uncovered stelae, inscriptions, and miniature images of Pharaohs Amenhotep III, Thutmose IV, Psamtik II, and Apries beneath the Nile waters in Aswan. These artifacts were initially discovered during the Nubian Monuments Rescue Campaign in the 1960s.

In August 2024, an Egyptian archaeological mission uncovered an astronomical observatory from the 6th century BCE at the Buto Temple, located at the Tell El-Faraeen archaeological site in the Kafr El Sheikh Governorate. The found artifacts included a statue from the 26th Dynasty, a merkhet measuring tool, some religious items and pottery remains.

In February 2025, researchers from University College London and the University of Ljubljana revealed that ancient Egyptian mummies, some up to 5,000 years old, emit unexpectedly pleasant aromas described as "woody," "spicy," "sweet," and occasionally floral. Utilizing non-invasive techniques, the team analyzed air samples from nine mummies housed at the Egyptian Museum in Cairo, attributing these scents to embalming materials like pine and juniper resins. This study not only offers insights into ancient mummification practices but also suggests that such olfactory analyses can enhance museum experiences by recreating historical "smellscapes."

In February 2025, a joint Egyptian-British archaeological team announced the discovery of the tomb of Thutmose II near Luxor, marking the first identification of a pharaonic royal tomb in over a century since that of Tutankhamun in 1922. Located west of the Valley of the Kings in an area known as Wadi C, the tomb—designated Wadi C-4—was identified through inscriptions on alabaster vessels bearing the names of Thutmose II and his wife, Hatshepsut. The tomb's interior featured fragments of funerary furniture and decorative elements, including blue-painted ceilings with yellow stars and religious texts. However, the site had suffered damage due to ancient flooding, which led to the deterioration of many of its original contents.

In March 2025, archaeologists from the French Institute of Oriental Archaeology uncovered two sets of iron ankle shackles at the Ghozza gold mine in the Eastern Desert, dating to the 3rd century BCE during the Ptolemaic period. The discovery provides evidence of forced labor in ancient Egyptian gold mining operations, corroborating historical texts that mention the use of prisoners of war and criminals in such mines.

In March 2025, archaeologists from the University of Pennsylvania Museum and Egypt's Supreme Council of Antiquities announced the discovery of a royal tomb at the Anubis Mountain necropolis in Abydos. Dating to the Second Intermediate Period (circa 1640–1540 BCE), the tomb is attributed to an unidentified pharaoh of the Abydos Dynasty. The limestone burial chamber, situated approximately seven meters underground, features mudbrick vaults and an entrance adorned with depictions of the goddesses Isis and Nephthys. Although the tomb had been looted in antiquity, erasing the pharaoh's name from inscriptions, scholars suggest possible identities such as Senaiib or Paentjeni, known from other monuments but whose tombs remain undiscovered. This find enhances understanding of the political fragmentation during the Second Intermediate Period and supports the existence of the Abydos Dynasty as a distinct ruling entity in Upper Egypt.

Additionally, in the Sohag province, Egyptian archaeologists uncovered a Roman-era pottery workshop and a 7th-century cemetery near the village of Banawit. Among the findings were 32 ostraca—pottery fragments inscribed with Demotic and Greek scripts—detailing commercial transactions and tax records. These discoveries shed light on the economic activities and burial practices in the region during the Byzantine period.

In April 2025, archaeologists announced the discovery of a 3,400-year-old settlement at Kom el-Nugus, approximately 43 kilometers west of Alexandria. This New Kingdom-era town, previously believed to be uninhabited until the Greek period, features organized urban planning, including a drainage system and a street designed to protect buildings from erosion. Structures include a temple constructed by Ramesses II and private funerary chapels referencing military personnel, suggesting the settlement may have had a military function. Another discovery is an amphora jar stamped with the name of Meritaten, daughter of Akhenaten and Nefertiti, indicating royal wine production and the region's early occupation possibly tied to Akhenaten's rule.

In April 2025, archaeologists led by Dr. Zahi Hawass uncovered the tomb of Prince Waser-If-Re, son of Userkaf, the founder of Egypt's Fifth Dynasty, at the Saqqara necropolis southwest of Cairo. The tomb features a pink granite false door, measuring 4.5 meters in height and 1.15 meters in width, inscribed with the prince's titles, including "Hereditary Prince," "Royal Scribe," "Vizier," and "Chanting Priest". According to the archaeologists, this is the first discovery of such a large pink granite false door at Saqqara, signifying the prince's high status. Additional findings include a red granite offering table, a black granite statue from the 26th Dynasty, and a group of 13 seated pink granite statues believed to represent the prince's wives. A statue of Djoser with his wife and ten daughters was also discovered, suggesting the tomb may have been reused during the Late Period.

In May 2025, three tombs of prominent statesmen were discovered in the Dra Abu el-Naga necropolis in the southern Egyptian city of Luxor. The discoveries date back to the New Kingdom period (1550 BC), with the names and titles of the tombs' owners also found through inscriptions within.

In May 2025, a joint Egyptian–Canadian archaeological mission identified the owner of Kampp 23, a rock-cut tomb located in the El-Asasif necropolis, Luxor, as Amun Mes, a high-ranking official who served as the mayor of Thebes during the Ramesside period. The tomb featuring a T-shaped layout typical of the 19th–20th Dynasties was first discovered in the 1970s but remained unattributed until recent excavations revealed inscriptions confirming Amun Mes's identity and several of his titles, including tax collector, royal advisor, divine father of Amun, and overseer of quarry expeditions. The team also found evidence of later reuse, such as painted plaster over original reliefs and fragments of ushabti figures.

In June 2025, British archaeologists unearthed the remains of the ancient city of Imet at Tell al-Faraon in Sharqia Governorate, a discovery announced by the Egyptian Ministry of Tourism and Antiquities. The excavation revealed remains of residential buildings, granaries, artifacts including a faience ushabti, a bronze sistrum with Hathor's head, and a Horus stela and animal shelters dating to the early or mid-4th century BCE. Imet, historically one of the residential centers in Lower Egypt during the New Kingdom and Late Period, was distinguished by a substantial temple dedicated to the goddess Wadjet. Evidence suggests this temple was reused during the reigns of King Ramses II and King Amasis II, attracting pilgrims and merchants, which accounts for the numerous associated houses and storage structures found.

In June 2025, archaeologists announced the discovery of three Old Kingdom tombs at the Qubbet el-Hawa necropolis in Aswan. The tombs, dated to the late 6th Dynasty (circa 2300–2100 BCE), consist of vertical shafts, small courtyards, false doors, offering tables, and pottery vessels. Human remains were also recovered, with evidence suggesting that the tombs were later reused during the Middle Kingdom. Although some of the tombs lacked inscriptions, they still exhibited traditional burial architecture and customs, which, according to the archaeologists, may indicate that the individuals buried there had limited economic means.

In September 2025, archaeologists announced the discovery of a previously unknown complete copy of the Canopus Decree at the Tell el-Fara‘un site in El-Husseiniya, Sharqia Governorate. The sandstone stele, dated to 238 BCE during the reign of Ptolemy III Euergetes, represents the first complete version of the decree found in more than 150 years and is inscribed entirely in hieroglyphs, unlike earlier trilingual copies (hieroglyphic, Demotic, and Greek). The stela features a rounded top adorned with a winged solar disk flanked by uraei (royal cobras) wearing the crowns of Upper and Lower Egypt, above 30 lines of hieroglyphic text carved in sunk relief. The discovery adds to the six previously known copies of the decree.

In November 2025, a French archaeological mission from Sorbonne University working at the San El-Hagar necropolis in the Nile Delta discovered 225 ushabti figurines, believed to belong to Shoshenq III of the 22nd Dynasty. The figurines were found in well-preserved condition inside the northern chamber of the tomb attributed to Osorkon II, lying near an uninscribed granite sarcophagus whose ownership has long been debated.

In 2025, archaeologists announced the discovery of a 2,000-year-old ancient Egyptian pleasure boat in the harbor of Alexandria, uncovered by the European Institute for Underwater Archaeology (IEASM) near the submerged island of Antirhodos. Measuring around 35 m (115 ft) long and 7 m (23 ft) wide, the vessel is believed to date to the first half of the 1st century AD, supported by Greek graffiti preserved on the timbers that may indicate Alexandrian construction. Identified as a thalamegos, a flat-bottomed leisure barge designed to carry a central pavilion for elite or ceremonial use.

In 2025, archaeologists announced the discovery of an ancient industrial complex dating to the 5th century BC and a Roman-era cemetery at the Kom al-Ahmar and Kom Wasit sites in Egypt's Western Nile Delta, near Alexandria. The multi-room industrial building, uncovered by a joint Egyptian–Italian mission from the Supreme Council of Antiquities and the University of Padua, comprises at least six chambers used for activities including large-scale fish processing, production of metal and stone tools, and manufacture of faience amulets, as evidenced by approximately 9,700 fish bones, unfinished limestone statues, and artefacts recovered during excavation. Imported Greek pottery and amphorae indicate extensive regional trade connections during the Late Period and early Ptolemaic era. Adjacent to the industrial remains, part of a Roman cemetery was found with varied burial types including simple ground burials, interments in pottery coffins, and child burials in large amphorae containing the remains of 23 individuals of differing ages and sexes, with bioarchaeological analysis underway to assess diet, health, and lifestyles.

In January 2026, archaeologists announced the discovery of a Byzantine-era monastic complex at Al-Qarya bi-Al-Duweir in the Tema district of Sohag Governorate. The Egyptian archaeological mission, conducted by the Supreme Council of Antiquities, uncovered the foundations of multiple mudbrick buildings that formed a monastic residential settlement dating to the Byzantine period. The remains include rectangular halls, cells believed to have served as monks’ living and worship spaces, and plastered walls with niches, while courtyards and small circular structures likely functioned as communal areas. Evidence of a central church with a nave, choir and sanctuary suggests organized religious life, and ancillary features such as red-brick and limestone basins indicate water storage or auxiliary functions. Artefacts recovered at the site included storage amphorae and Coptic-inscribed ostraca.

In January 2026, a joint Egyptian-Chinese archaeological mission announced the identification of a man-made reservoir at the Montu Temple precinct within the Karnak Temple Complex in Luxor. Excavations conducted over an eight-year period by the Chinese Academy of Social Sciences and the Egyptian Ministry of Tourism and Antiquities revealed the lake's stone-lined architecture, which characterizes it as part of a dual-lake configuration within the precinct. Archaeological findings in the immediate vicinity include bovine skeletal remains, three chapels dedicated to Osiris, and reused stone blocks associated with the 25th and 26th Dynasties and the Late Period (747–332 BC). Researchers indicate the reservoir's state of preservation provides data for the study of ancient purification rituals and urban temple design.

In February 2026, a study by researchers from Newcastle University and the Academy of Fine Arts Vienna reidentified a 5,300-year-old artifact from Predynastic Egypt as the oldest securely attested rotary metal drill in the Nile Valley. Originally excavated in the early 20th century from the Badari cemetery and previously misidentified as a simple awl, the 63mm copper-alloy object dates to approximately 3300–3000 BC. Microscopic analysis revealed use-wear patterns consistent with sustained rotary motion, while fragile leather coils found around the shaft were identified as the remains of a bowstring. Metallurgical analysis further revealed a complex alloy of copper, arsenic, nickel, lead, and silver, suggesting early sophisticated metalworking and participation in regional exchange networks.

In February 2026, the Egyptian Ministry of Tourism and Antiquities announced the discovery of a limestone architectural structure during excavations at Mit Rahina (ancient Memphis). The structure is closely linked to the temple of Pharaoh Apries. Excavations revealed massive limestone blocks that formed part of a substantial building or ceremonial entryway. Several blocks are inscribed with the cartouches of Pharaoh Apries and depict religious scenes, including the king performing rituals before the gods of Memphis.

In February 2026, the Egyptian Ministry of Tourism and Antiquities announced the discovery of a major cache of 22 colorful, sealed wooden sarcophagi of “Chanters of Amun,” containing mummies and eight papyri containing funerary texts and scenes from the Book of the Dead in the Tomb of Djeserkaraseneb (TT38) at Sheikh Abd el-Qurna in Luxor Governorate.

In March 2026, an Egyptian-German archaeological mission at the ancient site of Athribis, located near Sohag, announced the recovery of approximately 13,000 inscribed pottery fragments known as ostraca. This discovery brought the total number of ostraca unearthed at the site to roughly 43,000, representing one of the largest such collections ever recorded in Egypt. The artifacts span over a millennium, dating from the 3rd century BC through the 11th century AD, and feature a variety of scripts including Demotic, Greek, Hieratic, Coptic, and Arabic.

In March 2026, archaeologists from the Egyptian Ministry of Tourism and Antiquities announced Ithe discovery of a 5th-century CE building at the Qalaye site in Hosh Issa, Beheira Governorate, identified as a monastic guesthouse from the early period of Coptic monasticism. The structure, consisting of multiple rooms and functional spaces, was likely used to host visitors and monks, reflecting a transition from isolated ascetic practices to more organized, semi-communal religious life. Architectural features, including decorated elements and designated communal areas, provide valuable insights into the evolution of early monastic complexes and daily life within one of Egypt’s major monastic centers.

In April 2026, researchers identified a 2,000-year-old papyrus fragment in Cairo containing previously unknown verses by the Greek philosopher Empedocles, offering direct evidence of his original writings. The papyrus, catalogued as P. Fouad inv. 218, was identified by papyrologist Nathan Carlig in the archives of the French Institute of Oriental Archaeology. The fragment preserves approximately 30 previously unpublished verses from Empedocles’ philosophical poem commonly known as Physica (On Nature).

In April 2026, an archaeological mission led by the University of Barcelona and the Institute of the Ancient Near East at the El-Bahnasa site in Minya, uncovered a significant Roman-era tomb complex that provides evidence of complex, syncretic funerary traditions. The excavation revealed a range of mortuary practices, including mummification with linen wraps and gold leaf, as well as the deposition of cremated remains within limestone chambers alongside animal offerings, such as a feline head. The recovery of ritual objects, specifically three golden and one copper tongue, suggests a practice intended to allow the deceased to communicate in the afterlife, while the discovery of a papyrus fragment containing a passage from Homer’s Iliad and various bronze and terracotta figurines such as Cupid and Harpocrates underscores the fusion of Greek literary culture and Greco-Roman religious iconography with local Egyptian burial customs.

In April 2026, an Egyptian archaeological mission from the Supreme Council of Antiquities discovered a massive limestone statue which experts have identified as likely depicting Pharaoh Ramesses II. Standing approximately 2.2 meters tall and weighing between 5 and 6 tons, the statue is missing its lower section, including the base and legs. Archaeologists believe the statue was moved in antiquity from the ancient capital, Pi-Ramesses, to Tell el-Faraon to be repurposed within a religious complex. The artifact has been transferred to a museum storage facility in San El-Hagar, where it will undergo restoration in accordance with established conservation standards.

In May 2026, archaeologists excavating the Moharram Bek district of Alexandria uncovered architectural remains and artifacts dating to the Ptolemaic, Roman, and Byzantine periods. The excavation, conducted by Egypt’s Supreme Council of Antiquities, revealed a circular public bath of the Tholos type from the late Ptolemaic period and the remains of a Roman residential villa containing mosaic floors created using Opus Tessellatum and Opus Sectile techniques. Archaeologists also identified hydraulic installations associated with bathing facilities and water management. Recovered artifacts included marble statues interpreted as depictions of Bacchus, Asclepius, and Minerva, as well as coins, pottery vessels, oil lamps, and stamped amphora fragments. According to researchers, the findings provide evidence for continuous occupation of the area from the Ptolemaic period until the Byzantine era and contribute to studies of the historical urban layout of Alexandria.

In June 2026, an Egyptian archaeological mission excavating Tell Kom Aziza in Beheira Governorate uncovered part of a Greco-Roman cemetery containing a variety of burial forms, including simple pit burials, mudbrick-lined graves, painted plaster coffins, and barrel-shaped pottery coffins associated with the Ptolemaic period. Analysis of the human remains revealed differences in body orientation and burial position, indicating multiple funerary traditions. Stratigraphic evidence showed that the necropolis was established above earlier occupation layers dating to the Old Kingdom, New Kingdom, and Late Period, while associated finds included pottery vessels, stone tools, bread molds, ovens, storage jars, and animal remains. Archaeologists also documented several complete wild boar burials, a rare feature in ancient Egyptian funerary contexts.

In July 2026, an Egyptian archaeological mission excavating the Dakhla Oasis in Egypt’s Western Desert uncovered a 4th-century CE Byzantine residential city comprising a planned street network, residential quarters, a basilica church, two watchtowers, and a fortified structure with thick defensive walls. Archaeologists also identified houses with vaulted roofs, bread ovens, kitchens, stone grinding tools, bronze and gold coins, and more than 200 inscribed pottery fragments (ostraca) documenting economic transactions and daily activities. One residence, identified through inscriptions as belonging to a deacon named Tisous, is interpreted as having served as a house church before the construction of the basilica. The discovery provides evidence for urban organization, religious life, and economic activity in the Byzantine period of Egypt.

In July 2026, an Egyptian archaeological mission excavating the ancient city of Marina El Alamein uncovered 18 tombs, comprising 11 rock-cut hypogea and 7 limestone-built surface tombs, several of which remained sealed with their original stone slabs. The excavations revealed a 2.5-metre-long sealed granite sarcophagus, fragments of a plaster sphinx, an unfinished marble statue of Aphrodite, a limestone false-door offering altar, glass lacrimaria, pottery, amphorae, oil lamps, and 24 gold tongue amulets placed in the mouths of the deceased in accordance with Greco-Roman funerary traditions. Archaeologists also documented additional architectural remains and surface burials, increasing the total number of excavated tombs at the site to 44 and providing further evidence for funerary practices and the multicultural development of Marina El Alamein, identified with the ancient city of Leukaspis, during the Hellenistic, Roman, and Byzantine periods.

In August 2026, archaeologists excavating the ancient settlement of Asila in North Sinai, Egypt, uncovered the remains of a roadside caravanserai believed to have served commercial caravans, Egyptian pilgrims, and other travellers using the Sultan’s Road, also known as the Egyptian Pilgrims’ Road. The structure contains mudbrick and red-brick walls reinforced with limestone foundations, several rooms, and possible shops, while associated finds include large pottery vessels used for storing water and provisions, olive-green glazed pottery, red-and-white pottery, and fragments of lamps. The artifacts suggest a Mamluk-period date, although further analysis is required for precise dating. The discovery adds evidence for the network of stations that supported pilgrimage, trade, communication, and travel between Egypt, the Levant, and the Arabian Peninsula.

In August 2026, an Egyptian archaeological mission excavating the Sheikh Sobi necropolis in the Bahariya Oasis uncovered three tombs representing different funerary traditions. The first was a Late Period rock-cut communal tomb containing five mummies in limestone coffins, while the second was an apparently unused tomb and the third was a more complex Roman-period communal tomb containing limestone and pottery coffins. Additional finds included pottery vessels, offering tables, and terracotta votive figurines depicting female figures and stylized animals, providing evidence for changing funerary and religious practices among successive populations of the oasis.

In August 2026, archaeologists excavating Tell Abu Saifi in Qantara East, Ismailia, Egypt, uncovered a large sandstone lintel inscribed with the titles of Ramesses II and a reference to restoration work on a statue of Horus, Lord of Mesen, providing evidence for a possible connection between the site and the ancient city of Mesen. Excavations also revealed a large mudbrick enclosure surrounding a temple, two successive stone roads dating to the Ptolemaic and Roman periods, storage and service rooms, and a sanctuary later destroyed by quarrying. Other finds included a 26th-Dynasty schist statue of an army scribe, a royal basalt statue torso, and fragments of falcon statues. The site was later reused as a Roman military barracks in the 3rd century CE and subsequently as a lime quarry during the Late Roman period.

In October 2026, rescue excavations conducted by Egypt’s Supreme Council of Antiquities uncovered the remains of two colossal royal statues in Behbeit el-Hagar, Gharbia Governorate, in the Nile Delta. The first statue was identified as Ramesses II, who ruled during the 13th century BCE. Its surviving head, measuring approximately 1.6 metres in height, depicts the pharaoh wearing the double crown of Upper and Lower Egypt. Based on the dimensions of the head, archaeologists estimate that the complete statue originally stood about 8.5 metres (28 feet) tall, including its base. The second statue, preserved to a length of approximately 2.4 metres, may also represent Ramesses II, although its identification remains uncertain. Excavators additionally recovered a pink granite block bearing hieroglyphic inscriptions containing two of the pharaoh’s royal titles.

In November 2026, researchers investigating the ancient Egyptian city of Buto (Tell el-Fara’in) in the northwestern Nile Delta identified a buried structure dating to approximately 2,600 years ago, during the Saite period (664–525 BCE). The research combined radar imagery from the Sentinel-1 satellite with electrical resistivity tomography (ERT), a geophysical technique used to map underground structures by measuring variations in electrical resistance. Satellite data revealed potential archaeological anomalies, which were subsequently investigated through ground-based surveys and targeted excavation. The excavations uncovered mudbrick walls and a collection of religious objects, including amulets representing deities such as Isis, Horus, Taweret and Wadjet. One object depicted a hybrid figure combining features of a baboon, a falcon and the dwarf deity Patikos. The presence of ritual objects and an altar suggests that the building may have served a religious function, possibly as a temple, a priestly residence or a complex associated with funerary activities.

== Ministry of Antiquities (Egypt) ==
An edict issued by the Egyptian governor Muhammad Ali Pasha on August 15, 1835, banned the export and trade of all Egyptian antiques to another country. The decree helped to protect monuments and curb the smuggling of ancient Egyptian artifacts.

The Ministry of Tourism & Antiquities (officially called the "Antiquities Authority") is the Egyptian government organization which serves to protect and preserve the heritage and ancient history of Egypt. It was established in 1858.

In December 2019 it was merged into the Ministry of Tourism, with Khaled El-Anany retaining his function.

From 2009 to 2014, the ministry worked with the Getty Conservation Institute on the management and conservation of the tomb of Tutankhamun.

In September 2025, Tourism and Antiquities Minister Sherif Fathy reported that a 3,000-year-old gold bracelet, containing a lapis lazuli bead and once belonging to Amenemope, a pharaoh of Egypt's 21st Dynasty was stolen from the restoration laboratory of the Egyptian Museum, Cairo and subsequently sold and melted down. The stolen bracelet was first sold to a silver-shop owner, then passed to a gold jeweler, and eventually to a worker at a gold foundry.

== See also ==
- Egyptology
- Ancient Egypt
- Contemporary archaeology
