= Egyptology =

Scientific study of ancient Egypt

Egyptology (from Egypt and Greek -λογία, -logia; Arabic: علم المصريات) is the scientific study of ancient Egypt, including historic artifacts and ancient writing. The topics studied include ancient Egyptian history, language, literature, religion, architecture, culture and art from the 5th millennium BC until the end of its native religious practices in the 4th century AD.

== History ==
=== First explorers ===
The earliest explorers of ancient Egypt were the ancient Egyptians themselves. Inspired by a dream he had, Thutmose IV led an excavation of the Great Sphinx of Giza and inscribed a description of the dream on the Dream Stele. Less than two centuries later, Prince Khaemweset, fourth son of Ramesses II, would gain fame for identifying and restoring historic buildings, tombs and temples, including pyramids; and has subsequently been described as the first Egyptologist.

=== Classical Antiquity ===
Some of the first historical accounts of Egypt were given by Herodotus, Strabo, Diodorus Siculus and the largely lost work of Manetho, an Egyptian priest, during the reign of Ptolemy I and Ptolemy II in the 3rd century BC. The Ptolemies were very interested in the work of the ancient Egyptians, and many of the Egyptian monuments, including the pyramids, were restored by them. The Ptolemies also built many new temples in the Egyptian style. The Romans also carried out restoration work in Egypt.

=== Middle Ages ===
Throughout the Middle Ages, travelers on pilgrimages to the Holy Land would occasionally detour to visit sites in Egypt. Destinations would include Cairo and its environs, where the Holy Family was thought to have fled, and the great Pyramids, which were thought to be Joseph's Granaries, built by the Hebrew patriarch to store grain during the years of plenty. A number of their accounts (Itineraria) have survived and offer insights into conditions in their respective time periods.

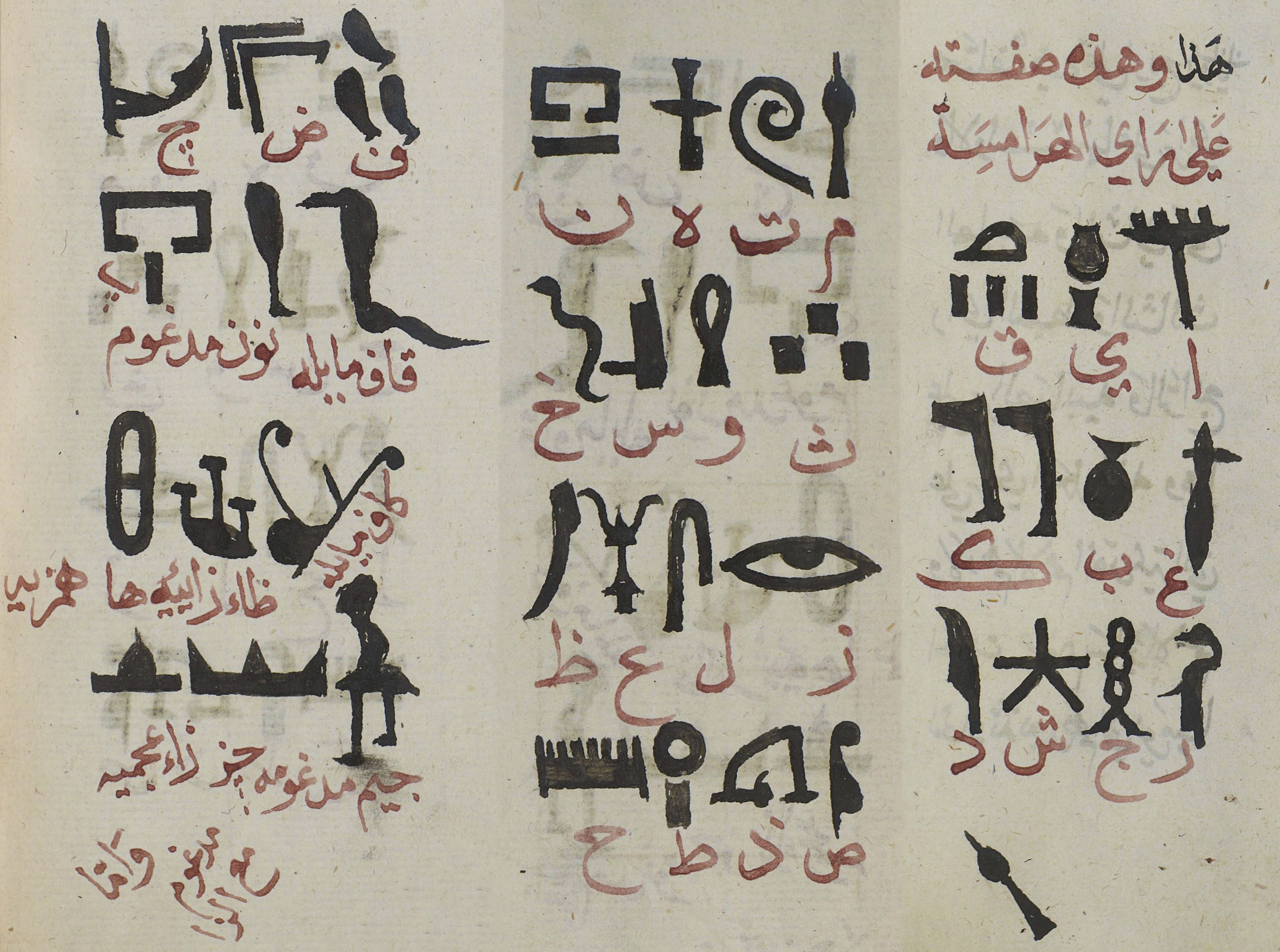
pseudo-Ibn Wahshiyya's 985 CE attempted translation of Ancient Egyptian hieroglyphs

Medieval Islamic scholars studied Ancient Egypt and made attempts at translating Ancient Egyptian texts into Arabic. These Arabic scholars were key in preserving and sharing knowledge about Egypt, connecting ancient civilizations to the Islamic world. Abdul Latif al-Baghdadi, a teacher at Cairo's Al-Azhar University in the 13th century, wrote detailed descriptions of ancient Egyptian monuments. Similarly, the 15th-century Egyptian historian al-Maqrizi wrote detailed accounts of Egyptian antiquities.

=== European explorers ===
European exploration and travel writings of ancient Egypt commenced in the 13th century, with only occasional detours into what could be considered a scientific approach, notably by Claude Sicard, Benoît de Maillet, Frederic Louis Norden and Richard Pococke.

In the early 17th century, John Greaves measured the pyramids, having inspected the broken Obelisk of Domitian in Rome, then intended for Lord Arundel's collection in London. He went on to publish the illustrated Pyramidographia in 1646.

The Jesuit scientist-priest Athanasius Kircher was perhaps the first to hint at the phonetic importance of Egyptian hieroglyphs, demonstrating Coptic as a vestige of early Egyptian, for which he is considered a founder of Egyptology.

=== Modern Egyptology ===
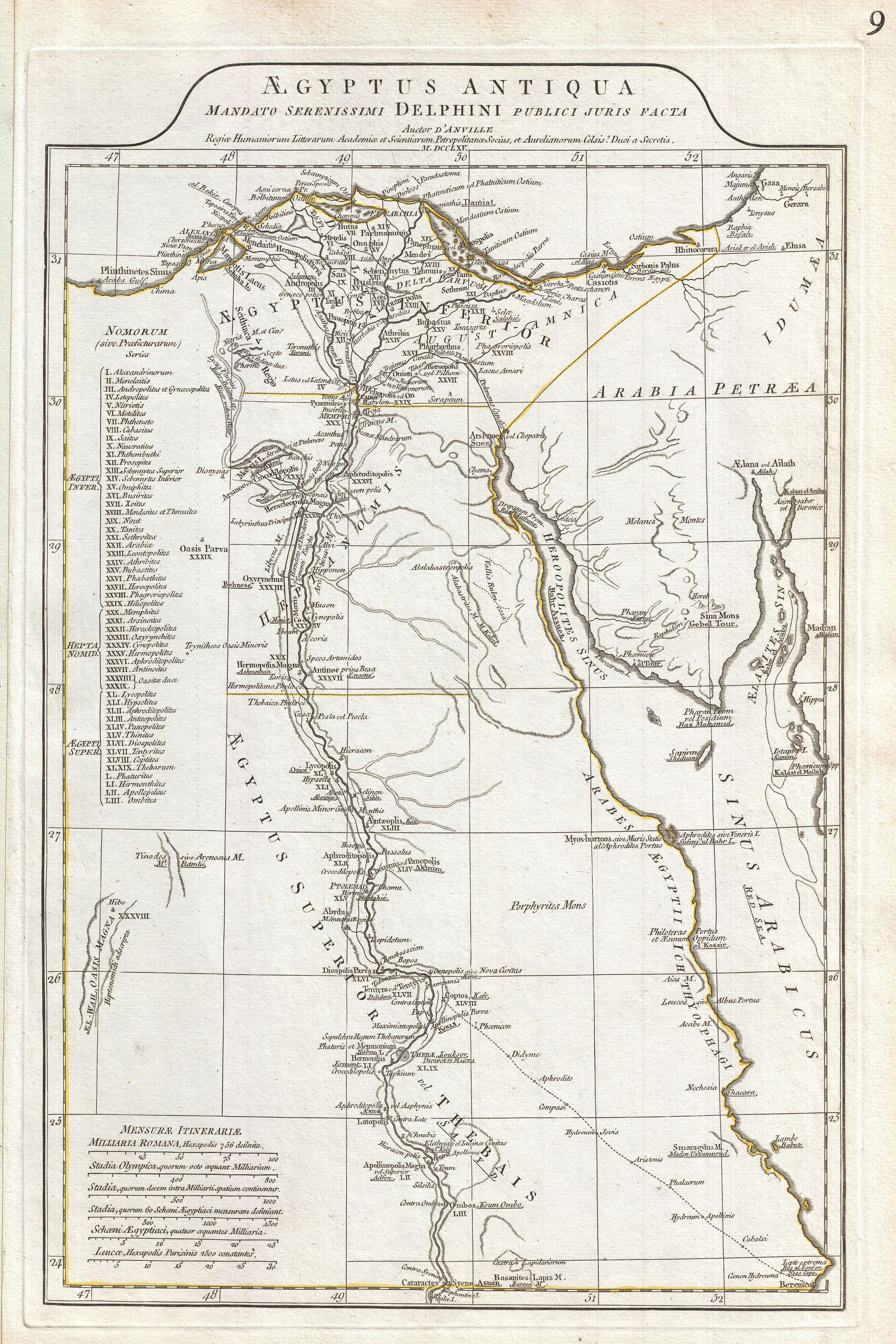
Jean-Baptiste Bourguignon d'Anville's 1765 map was the primary map used in the 1809–1829 Description de l'Égypte.

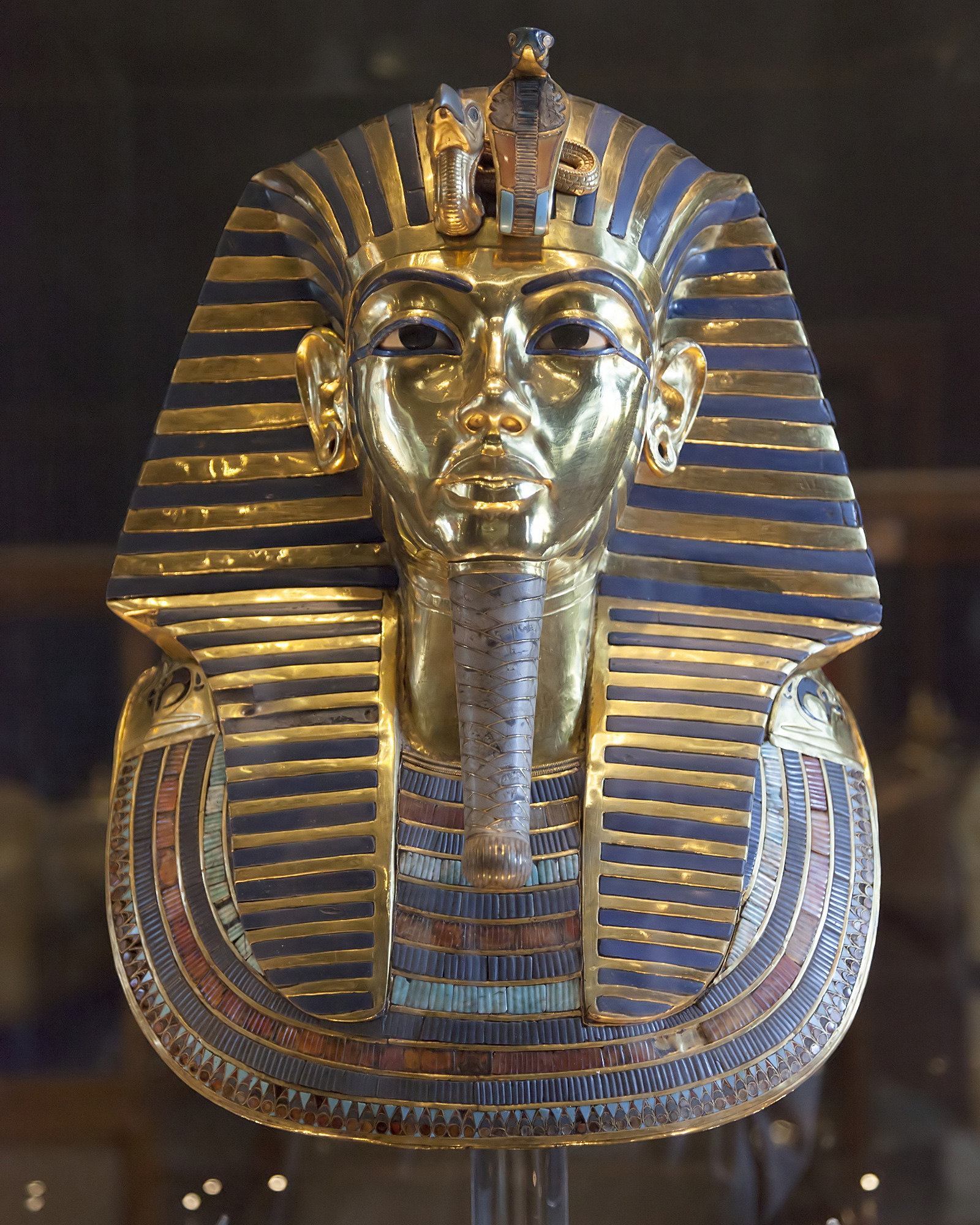
The gold funerary mask of Tutankhamun

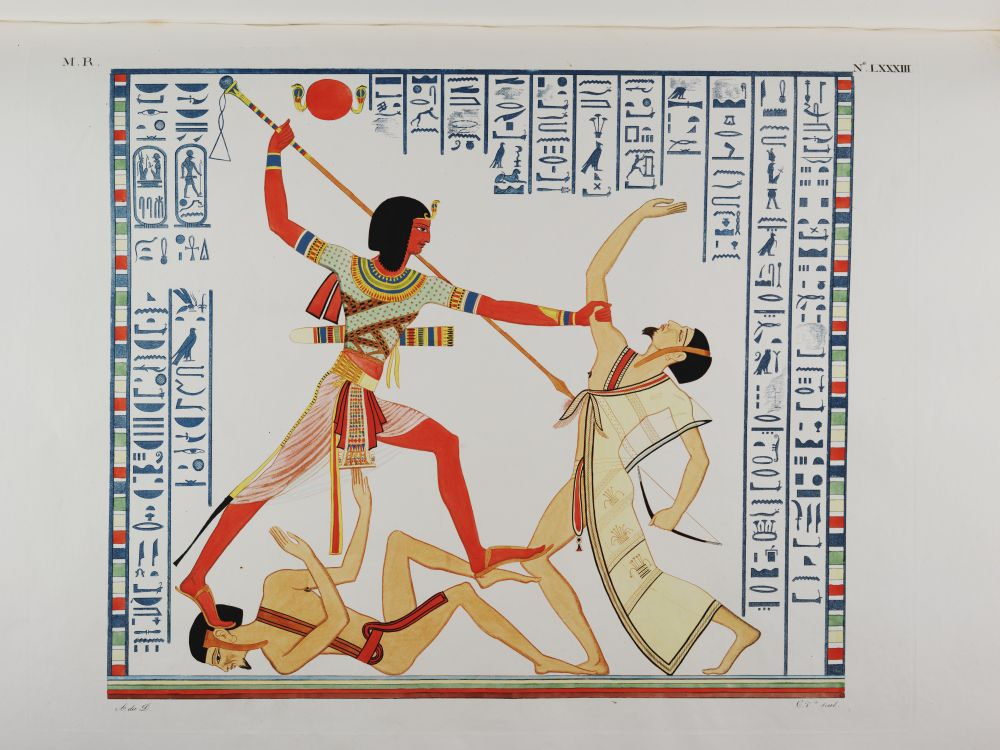
Hieroglyphs and depictions transcribed by Ippolito Rosellini in 1832

Egyptology's modern history begins with the invasion of Egypt by Napoleon Bonaparte in the late 18th century. The Rosetta Stone was discovered in 1799. The study of many aspects of ancient Egypt became more scientifically oriented with the publication of Mémoires sur l'Égypte in 1800 and the more comprehensive Description de l'Egypte between 1809 and 1829. These recorded Egyptian flora, fauna, and history—making numerous ancient Egyptian source materials available to Europeans for the first time. The British captured Egypt from the French and gained the Rosetta Stone in 1801, the Greek script of which was translated by 1803. In 1822, the corresponding Egyptian hieroglyphs were deciphered by Jean-François Champollion, marking the beginning of modern Egyptology. With increasing knowledge of Egyptian writing, the study of ancient Egypt was able to proceed with greater academic rigour. Champollion, Thomas Young and Ippolito Rosellini were some of the first Egyptologists of wide acclaim. The German Karl Richard Lepsius was an early participant in the investigations of Egypt—mapping, excavating and recording several sites.

English Egyptologist Flinders Petrie (1853–1942) introduced archaeological techniques of field preservation, recording, and excavation to the field. Many highly educated amateurs also travelled to Egypt, including women such as Harriet Martineau and Florence Nightingale. Both of these left accounts of their travels, which revealed learned familiarity with all of the latest European Egyptology. Howard Carter's 1922 discovery of the tomb of 18th Dynasty King Tutankhamun brought a greater understanding of Egyptian relics and wide acclaim to the field.

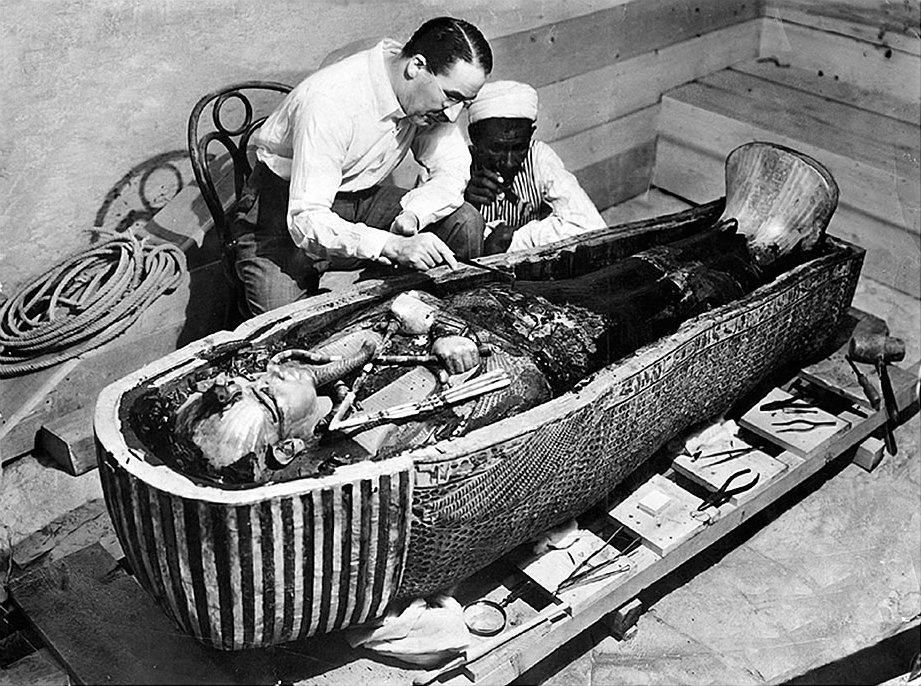
Howard Carter examines the opened coffin of the Eighteenth Dynasty pharaoh Tutankhamun with a local assistant in Luxor, Egypt, 1925

In the modern era, the Ministry of State for Antiquities controls excavation permits for Egyptologists to conduct their work. The field can now use geophysical methods and other applications of modern sensing techniques.

In June 2000, the European Institute for Underwater Archaeology (IEASM), directed by Franck Goddio, in cooperation with the Egyptian Ministry for Antiquities discovered the ancient sunken city of Thonis-Heracleion in today's Abu Qir Bay. The statues of a colossal King and Queen are on display at the Grand Egyptian Museum. Other discovered artefacts are exhibited at the Bibliotheca Alexandrina and Alexandria National Museum. The excavations are documented through several publications

In March 2017, the Egyptian-German team of archaeologists unearthed an eight-meter 3,000-year-old statue that included a head and a torso thought to depict Pharaoh Ramses II. According to Khaled El-Enany, the Egyptian Antiquities Minister, the statue was more likely thought to be King Psammetich I. Excavators also revealed an 80 cm-long part of a limestone statue of Pharaoh Seti II while excavating the site.

In August 2017, archaeologists from the Ministry of Antiquities announced the discovery of five mud-brick tombs at Bir esh-Shaghala, dating back nearly 2,000 years. Researchers also revealed worn masks gilded with gold, several large jars and a piece of pottery with unsolved ancient Egyptian writing on it.

In November 2017 (25 October 2000), the Egyptian mission in cooperation with the European Institute for Underwater Archaeology announced the discovery of 2,000-year-old three sunken shipwrecks dated back to the Roman Era in Alexandria's Abu Qir Bay.

The sunken cargo included a royal head of crystal perhaps belong to the commander of the Roman armies of "Antonio", three gold coins from the era of Emperor Octavius Augustus, large wooden planks and pottery vessels.

In April 2018, the Egyptian Ministry of Antiquities announced the discovery of the head of the bust of Roman Emperor Marcus Aurelius at the Temple of Kom Ombo in Aswan during work to protect the site from groundwater.

In April 2018, the Egyptian Ministry of Antiquities announced the discovery of the shrine of the Egyptian god Osiris- Ptah Neb, dating back to the 25th dynasty in the Temple of Karnak in Luxor. According to archaeologist Essam Nagy, the material remains from the area contained clay pots, the lower part of a sitting statue and part of a stone panel showing an offering table filled with a sheep and a goose which were the symbols of the god Amun.

In July 2018, German-Egyptian researchers' team head by Ramadan Badry Hussein of the University of Tübingen reported the discovery of an extremely rare gilded burial mask that probably dates from the Saite-Persian period in a partly damaged wooden coffin in Saqqara. The last time a similar mask was found was in 1939. The eyes were covered with obsidian, calcite, and black hued gemstone possibly onyx. "The finding of this mask could be called a sensation. Very few masks of precious metal have been preserved to the present day, because the tombs of most Ancient Egyptian dignitaries were looted in ancient times." said Hussein.

In July 2018, archaeologists led by Zeinab Hashish announced the discovery of a 2,000-year-old 30-ton black granite sarcophagus in Alexandria. It contained three damaged skeletons in red-brown sewage water. According to archaeologist Mostafa Waziri, the skeletons looked like a family burial with a middle-aged woman and two men. Researchers also revealed a small gold artifact and three thin sheets of gold.

In September 2018, a sandstone sphinx statue was discovered at the temple of Kom Ombo. The statue, measuring approximately 28 cm (11 in) in width and 38 cm (15 in) in height, likely dates to the Ptolemaic Dynasty.

In September 2018, several dozen cache of mummies dating 2,000 years back were found in Saqqara by a team of Polish archaeologists led by Kamil Kuraszkiewicz from the Faculty of Oriental Studies of the University of Warsaw.

In November 2018, an Egyptian archaeological mission located seven ancient Egyptian tombs at the ancient necropolis of Saqqara containing a collection of scarab and cat mummies dating back to the Fifth and Sixth Dynasties. Three of the tombs were used for cats, some dating back more than 6,000 years, while one of four other sarcophagi was unsealed. With the remains of cat mummies were unearthed gilded and 100 wooden statues of cats and one in bronze dedicated to the cat goddess Bastet. In addition, funerary items dating back to the 12th Dynasty were found besides the skeletal remains of cats.

In mid-December 2018, the Egyptian government announced the discovery at Saqqara of a previously unknown 4,400-year-old tomb, containing paintings and more than fifty sculptures. It belongs to Wahtye, a high-ranking priest who served under King Neferirkare Kakai during the Fifth Dynasty. The tomb also contains four shafts that lead to a sarcophagus below.

According to the Al-Ahram, in January 2019, archaeologists headed by Mostafa Waziri revealed a collection of 20 tombs dated back to the Second Intermediate Period in Kom Al-Khelgan. The burials contained the remains of animals, amulets, and scarabs carved from faience, round and oval pots with handholds, flint knives, broken and burned pottery. All burials included skulls and skeletons in the bending position and were not very well-preserved.

In April 2019, archaeologists discovered 35 mummified remains of Egyptians in a tomb in Aswan. Italian archaeologist Patrizia Piacentini, professor of Egyptology at the University of Milan, and Khaled El-Enany, the Egyptian minister of antiquities reported that the tomb where the remains of ancient men, women and children were found, dates back to the Greco-Roman period between 332 BC and 395 AD. While the findings assumed belonging to a mother and a child were well preserved, others had suffered major destruction. Beside the mummies, artefacts including painted funerary masks, vases of bitumen used in mummification, pottery and wooden figurines were revealed. Thanks to the hieroglyphics on the tomb, it was detected that the tomb belongs to a tradesman named Tjit.

On 13 April 2019, an expedition led by a member of the Czech Institute of Egyptology, Mohamed Megahed, discovered a 4,000-year-old tomb near Egypt's Saqqara Necropolis in Saqqara. Archaeologists confirmed that the tomb belonged to an influential person named Khuwy, who lived in Egypt during the 5th Dynasty. "The L-shaped Khuwy tomb starts with a small corridor heading downwards into an antechamber and from there a larger chamber with painted reliefs depicting the tomb owner seated at an offerings table", reported Megahed. Some paintings maintained their brightness over a long time in the tomb. Mainly made of white limestone bricks, the tomb had a tunnel entrance generally typical for pyramids. Archaeologists say that there might be a connection between Khuwy and pharaoh because the mausoleum was found near the pyramid of Egyptian Pharaoh Djedkare Isesi, who ruled during that time.

In July 2019, ancient granite columns and a smaller Greek temple, treasure-laden ships, along with bronze coins from the reign of Ptolemy II, pottery dating back to the third and fourth centuries BC were found at the sunken city of Heracleion. The investigations were conducted by Egyptian and European divers led by underwater archaeologist Franck Goddio. They also uncovered the ruins of the city's main temple off of Egypt's north coast.

In September 2019, archaeologists announced the discovery of a 2,200-year-old temple believed to belong to Ptolemy IV in Kom Shakau village of Tama township. Researchers also revealed limestone walls carved with inscriptions of Hapi, the Nile god, and inscriptions with fragments of text featuring the name of Ptolemy IV.

In May 2020, Egyptian-Spanish archaeological mission head by Esther Ponce uncovered a unique cemetery dating back to the 26th Dynasty (so-called the El-Sawi era) at the site of ancient Oxyrhynchus. Archaeologists found tombstones, bronze coins, small crosses, and clay seals inside eight Roman-era tombs with domed and unmarked roofs.

On 3 October 2020, Khalid el-Anany, Egypt's tourism and antiquities minister announced the discovery of at least 59 sealed sarcophagi with mummies more than 2,600 years old in Saqqara. Archaeologists also revealed the 20 statues of Ptah-Soker and a carved 35-centimeter tall bronze statue of the Egyptian god Nefertem.

On 19 October 2020, the Ministry of Tourism and Antiquities announced the discovery of more than 2,500 years of colorful, sealed sarcophagi in Saqqara. The archaeological team unearthed gilded, wooden statues and more than 80 coffins.

In November 2020, archaeologists unearthed more than 100 delicately painted wooden coffins and 40 funeral statues. The sealed, wooden coffins, some containing mummies, date as far back as 2,500 years. Other artifacts discovered include funeral masks, canopic jars and amulets. According to Khaled el-Anany, tourism and antiquities minister, the items date back to the Ptolemaic dynasty. One of the coffins was opened and a mummy was scanned with an X-ray, determining it was most likely a man about the age of 40.

In January 2021, the Tourism and Antiquities Ministry announced the discovery of more than 50 wooden sarcophagi in 52 burial shafts which date back to the New Kingdom period and a 13 ft-long papyrus that contains texts from the Book of the Dead. Archaeologists led by Zahi Hawass also found the funerary temple of Naert and warehouses made of bricks in Saqqara.

In January 2021, Egyptian-Dominican researchers led by Kathleen Martinez have announced the discovery of 2,000-year-old ancient tombs with golden tongues dating to the Greek and Roman periods at Taposiris Magna. The team also unearthed gold leaf amulets in the form of tongues placed for speaking with God Osiris afterlife. The mummies were depicted in different forms: one of them was wearing a crown, decorated with horns, and the cobra snake at the forehead and the other was depicted with gilded decorations representing the wide necklace.

A team of archaeologists led by Zahi Hawass also found the funerary temple of Naert or Narat and warehouses made of bricks in Saqqara. Researchers also revealed that Narat's name engraved on a fallen obelisk near the main entrance. Previously unknown to researchers, Naert was a wife of Teti, the first king of the sixth dynasty.

In February 2021, archaeologists from the Egyptian Ministry of Tourism and Antiquities announced the discovery of a Ptolemaic period temple, a Roman fort, an early Coptic church and an inscription written in hieratic script at an archaeological site called Shiha Fort in Aswan. According to Mostafa Waziri, the crumbling temple was decorated with palm leaf carvings and an incomplete sandstone panel that described a Roman emperor. According to researcher Abdel Badie, generally, the church with about 2.1 meters width contained oven that were used to bake pottery, four rooms, a long hall, stairs, and stone tiles.

In April 2021, Egyptian archeologists announced the discovery of 110 burial tombs at the Koum el-Khulgan archeological site in Dakahlia Governorate. 68 oval-shaped tombs of them dated back to the Predynastic Period and 37 rectangular-shaped tombs were from Second Intermediate Period. Rest of them dated back to the Naqada III period. The tombs also contained the remains of adults and a baby (buried in a jar), a group of ovens, stoves, remnants of mud-brick foundations, funerary equipment, cylindrical, pear-shaped vessels and a bowl with geometric designs.

In September 2021, archaeologists announce the discovery of ritualistic tools used in religious rituals at the ancient site of Tel al-Fara in the Kafr El-Sheikh Governorate. Remains included a limestone pillar depicting goddess Hathor, some incense burners with the head of the god Horus. Hossam Ghanim, said: "The mission also discovered a huge building of polished limestone from the inside, representing a well for holy water used in daily rituals".

In May 2022, the discovery of the nearly 4,300-year-old tomb of an ancient Egyptian high-ranked person who handled royal, sealed documents of pharaoh was announced at Saqqara, Egypt. According to University of Warsaw's Polish Centre of Mediterranean Archaeology, the elaborately decorated tomb belonged to a man named Mehtjetju who served as a priest and an inspector of the royal property. Kamil O. Kuraszkiewicz, expedition director stated that Mehtjetju most likely lived at about the same time, at some point during the reigns of the first three rulers of the Sixth Dynasty: Teti, Userkare and Pepy I.

In June 2022, archaeologists from The Cairo Ministry of Antiquities announced the discovery of an alabaster bust of Alexander the Great as well as molds and other materials for creating amulets for warriors and for statues of Alexander the Great.

In July 2022, archaeologists from the Prague's Charles University led by Miroslav Bárta discovered the robbed tomb of an ancient Egyptian military official named Wahibre-mery-Neith and a scarab in Giza's Abusir necropolis 12 km southeast of the Pyramids of Giza. He commanded battalions of non-local soldiers and likely lived in the late 26th and early 27th dynasties, around 500 BC, according to the Egyptian Antiquities Ministry. The tomb's main well was about 6 meters deep and it was divided into separate parts by narrow bridges cut into the natural rock. Inside the main well there was a smaller and deeper shaft which contained two sarcophagi one inside the other where Wahibre-mery-Neith was buried. The external sarcophagus was made of white limestone while the internal coffin was made out of basalt rock measures 2.30 meters long and 1.98 meters wide. The inner sarcophagus contained an inscription from the 72nd chapter of the Egyptian Book of Dead said Miroslav Barta.

In August 2022, archaeologists from the Polish Academy of Sciences in Warsaw announced the discovery of a 4,500-year-old temple dedicated to the Egyptian sun god Ra. The recently discovered sun temple was made from mud bricks and was about 60 meters long by 20 m wide. According to Massimiliano Nuzzolo, co-director of the excavation, storage rooms and other rooms may have been served for cultic purposes and the walls of the building were all plastered in black and white. The L-shaped entrance portico had two limestone columns and was partly made of white limestone. Dozens of well-preserved beer jars and several well-made and red-lined vessels, seal impressions, including seals of the pharaohs who ruled during the fifth and sixth dynasties were also uncovered. One of the earliest seals might belonged to pharaoh Shepseskare, who ruled Egypt before Nyuserre.

=== Bias in Egyptology ===
Various scholars have highlighted the role of colonial racism in shaping the attitudes of early Egyptologists, and criticised the continued over-representation of North American and European perspectives in the field over African ones. Cheikh Anta Diop in his work, The African Origin of Civilization argued that the prevailing views in Egyptology were driven by biased scholarship and colonial attitudes. Similarly, Bruce Trigger wrote that early modern scholarship on the Nile Valley populations had been "marred by a confusion of race, language, and culture and by an accompanying racism".

British Africanist Basil Davidson wrote in 1995 that a number of unsatisfactory labels are often attached—such as "Bushmen", "Negro", or "Negroid"—to indigenous, African populations. He was also critical of the Hamitic hypothesis and other categorisations of "North African stocks" as "white". Davidson further added that the "ancient Egyptians belonged, that is, not to any specific Egyptian region or Near Eastern heritage but to that wide community of peoples who lived between the Red Sea and the Atlantic Ocean, shared a common "Saharan-Sudanese culture", and drew their reinforcements from the same great source, even though, as time went by, they also absorbed a number of wanderers from the Near East".

In 2018, Stuart Tyson Smith argued that a common practice among Egyptologists was to "divorce Egypt from its proper northeast African context, instead framing it as fundamentally part of a Near Eastern or "Mediterranean" economic, social and political sphere, hardly African at all or at best a crossroad between the Near East, the eastern Mediterranean and Africa, which carries with it the implication that it is ultimately not really part of Africa". He explicitly criticised the view that ancient Egypt was clearly 'in Africa' it was not so clearly 'of Africa' as reflecting "long-standing Egyptological biases". He concluded that the interrelated cultural features shared between northeast African dynamic and Pharaonic Egypt are not "survivals" or coincidence, but shared traditions with common origins in the deep past".

In 2021, Marc Van De Mieroop stated that "It was only recently that traditional scholarship started to acknowledge the African background of Egyptian culture, partly in response to world history's aim to replace dominant western-centered narratives with others than focused more on the contributions of other regions, including Africa. At the same time, primarily African diaspora communities wanted the continent's ancient history to be approached outside a Eurocentric context, and insisted, for example, on the use of ancient Egyptian term kemet instead of the European one".

Egyptian archaeologist Fekri Hassan issued a statement in 2021:

"Egypt is situated where African cultural developments conjoin, mingle, and blend with those of neighboring cultures of southwest Asia and the Mediterranean. Yet, Egyptology, through its Eurocentered perspectives, has generally been lax in exploring and valorizing Egypt’s African origins. This not only leads to theoretical shortcomings but also to serious ethical ramifications undermining efforts for a new world of justice, equity, and fraternity. Keeping with the way our world is changing and given our role as socially responsible scholars, Egyptologists need to engage in emphasizing the grounding of Egypt in African cultures and its interaction throughout its history with African cultures".

In 2022, Andrea Manzo argued that early Egyptologists had situated the origins of dynastic Egypt within a "broad Hamitic horizon that characterised several regions of Africa" and that these views had continued to dominate in the second half of the twentieth century. Manzo stated more recent studies had "pointed out the relevance of African elements to the rise of Egyptian culture, following earlier suggestions on Egyptian kingship and religion by Henri Frankfort" which countered the traditional view that considered Egypt "more closely linked to the Near East than to the rest of Africa".

In 2023, Christopher Ehret outlined that the previous two centuries of Western scholarship had presented Egypt as an "offshoot of earlier Middle Eastern developments". Although, he acknowledged that recent generations of scholars in Egypt and Nubia have been "uncovering extensive new bodies of evidence" which have dispelled older assumptions. However, Ehret continued to argue that these old ideas had influenced the attitudes of scholars in other disciplines such as genetics.

== Academic discipline ==
Egyptology was established as an academic discipline through the research of Ippolito Rosellini in Italy, Emmanuel de Rougé in France, Samuel Birch in England, and Heinrich Brugsch in Germany. In 1880, Flinders Petrie, another British Egyptologist, revolutionised the field of archaeology through controlled and scientifically recorded excavations. Petrie's work determined that Egyptian culture dated back as early as 4500 BC. The British Egypt Exploration Fund founded in 1882 and other Egyptologists promoted Petrie's methods. Other scholars worked on producing a hieroglyphic dictionary, developing a Demotic lexicon, and establishing an outline of ancient Egyptian history.

In the United States, the founding of the Oriental Institute at the University of Chicago and the expedition of James Henry Breasted to Egypt and Nubia established Egyptology as a legitimate field of study. In 1924, Breasted also started the Epigraphic Survey to make and publish accurate copies of monuments. In the late 19th and early 20th century, the Metropolitan Museum of Art; the University of Pennsylvania; the Museum of Fine Arts, Boston; the Brooklyn Institute of Fine Arts; and the Institute of Fine Arts, New York University also conducted excavations in Egypt, expanding American collections.

In 1999, under the leadership of Prof. Ioannis Liritzis, Egyptology was introduced as an academic discipline in Greece, specifically in the Department of Mediterranean Studies (DMS) of the University of the Aegean. Beginning in 1998, Prof. Liritzis has collaborated with Egyptian authorities to encourage research, fieldwork, and education, all supported by Greek and European funding. The Hellenic-Egyptian relationship in Egyptological studies has been successful, largely due to Prof. Liritzis, and the result is a plethora of publications and interactions.

Some universities and colleges offer degrees in Egyptology. In the United States, these include the University of Chicago, Brown University, New York University, Yale University and Indiana University - Bloomington, and California State University San Bernardino. There are also many programmes in the United Kingdom, including those at the University of Oxford, the University of Cambridge, Swansea University, the University of Liverpool, the University of Manchester, and the University of London. While Egyptology is widely studied in continental Europe, only two--Leiden University and Uppsala University—offer degree programs taught in English.

The professional organisation of scholars in Egyptology is the International Association of Egyptologists (IAE), under whose auspices an International Congress of Egyptologists (ICE) is held every four years.

Societies for Egyptology include:

- The Society for the Study of Ancient Egypt
- The Society for the Study of Ancient Egyptian Antiquities, Canada
- Sussex Egyptology Society Online
- Egypt Exploration Society

According to UCLA, the standard text that scholars referenced for studies of Egyptology was for three decades or more, the Lexikon der Ägyptologie (LÄ). The first volume published in 1975 (containing largely German-language articles, with a few in English and French).

== See also ==
- Ancient Egypt in the Western imagination ("Egyptomania")
- Archaeology of Ancient Egypt
- Assyriology
- Coptology
- List of Egyptologists
- Nubiology
