= Nauer =

Nauer is a surname of German origin, originating as an occupational name for a ferryman. Notable people with the surname include:

- Brunhilde Nauer (born 1959), German politician
- Daria Nauer (born 1966), Swiss retired long-distance runner
- Thomas Nauer (1910-1953), Samoan politician

== See also ==
- Neuer (surname)
- Nauert
