= Giovanni Battista Caviglia =

Italian explorer, navigator and Egyptologist

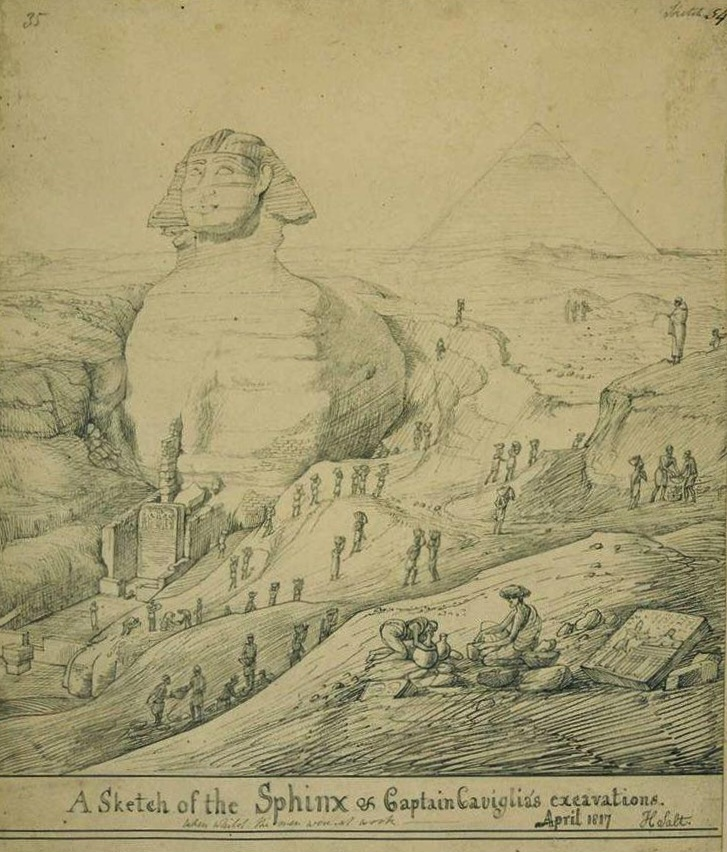
- Sketch drawn by Henry Salt showing Caviglia's excavations around the Sphinx of Giza
- Born: 1770; Genoa, Republic of Genoa
- Died: 7 September 1845 (aged 74–75); Paris, Kingdom of France
- Occupations: Explorer; Pioneer archaeologist
- Known for: Clearing of sand from the Sphinx of Giza; Discovery of the Colossus of Ramses II
- Scientific career
- Fields: Egyptology

Giovanni Battista Caviglia (1770 in Genoa – 7 September 1845, in Paris) was an Italian explorer, navigator and Egyptologist. He was one of the pioneers of Egyptian archeology of his time. He was influential in the excavation of the Sphinx of Giza near Cairo.

== Early life ==
He was born in Genoa in 1771 at a time when the city was the capital of the Republic of Genoa. He spent most of his life sailing in the Mediterranean in which he became a merchant captain.

== Career in Egypt ==
When he decided to start his career as an explorer, he left his ship moored in Alexandria and offered his services to various collectors. Most of his excavations were carried out on behalf of the British Consul General Henry Salt.

Between 1816 and 1817, he explored the Great Pyramid of Giza where he made important discoveries, including the descending corridor, the bottom of the well service and unfinished underground room.

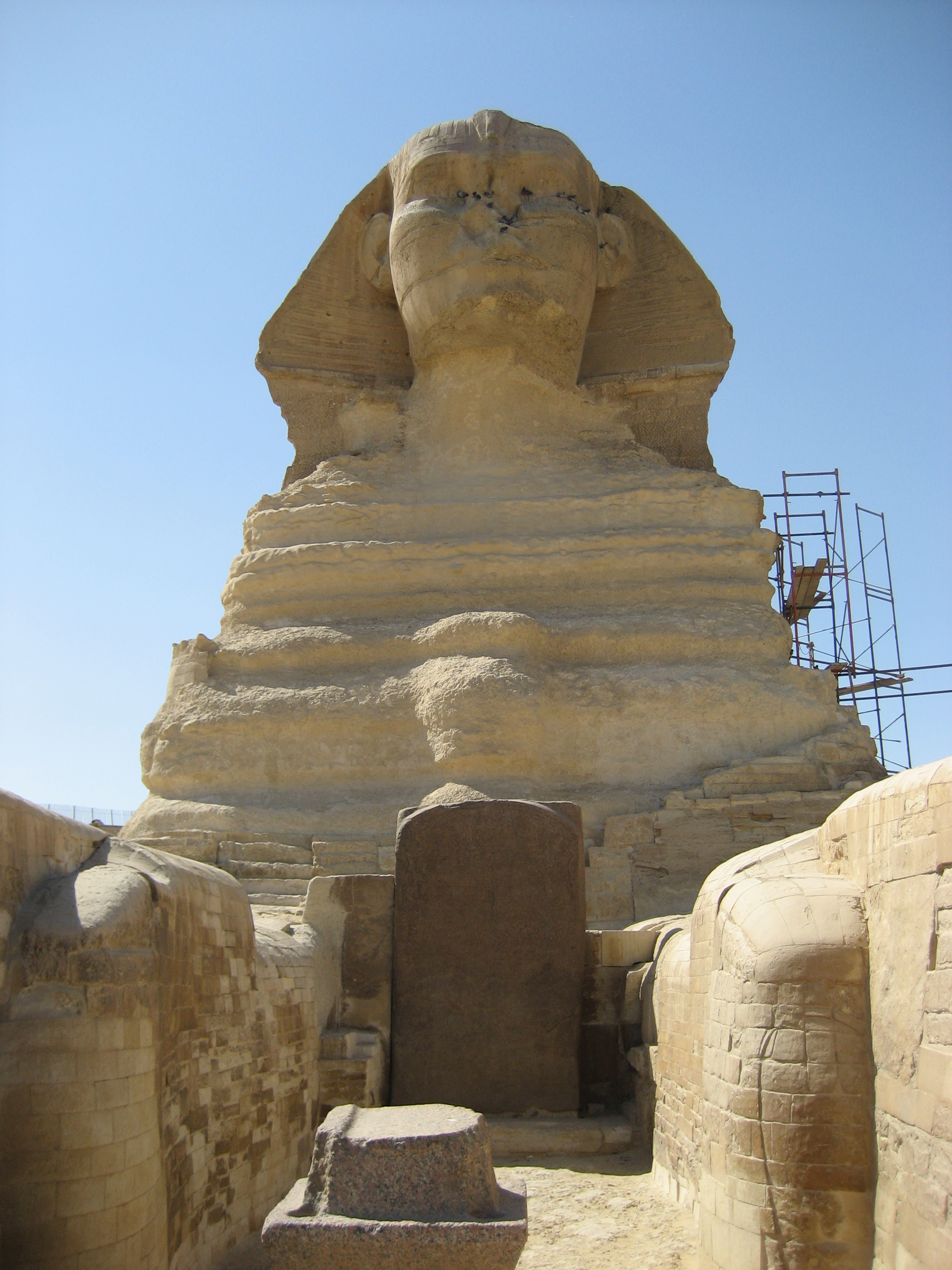
The Dream Stele of Thutmose IV between the paws of the Sphinx

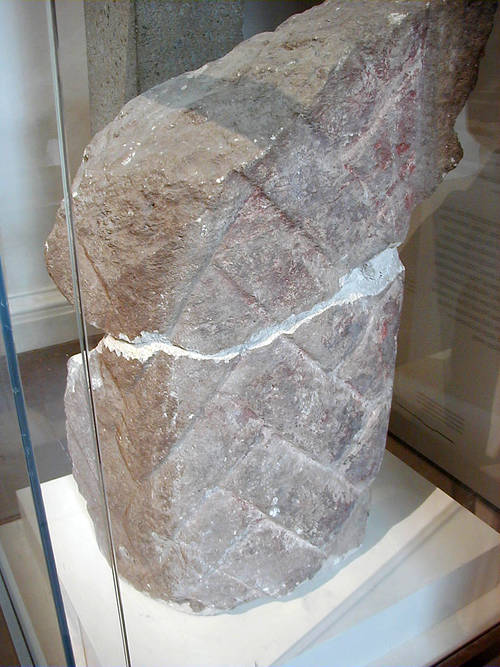
Fragments of the ceremonial beard of the sphinx kept in the British Museum in London

In 1817, Salt hired him to excavate the Great Sphinx at Giza, which over the centuries had been almost totally covered by the desert sand.

Caviglia was the first person in almost two thousand years to uncover the full-scale of the Sphinx. The last excavation around the monumental sculpture had been carried out in 160 AD, on the orders of the Roman emperor Roman Emperor Marcus Aurelius. At the head of a team of around 160 workers, Caviglia cleared away the sand to reveal the statue's chest and paws, as well as the Dream Stele. As the excavations continued, he came upon an array of ancient Egyptian artifacts and inscriptions in Greek and Latin. Caviglia had to suspend his research in 1819 due to a serious eye problem.

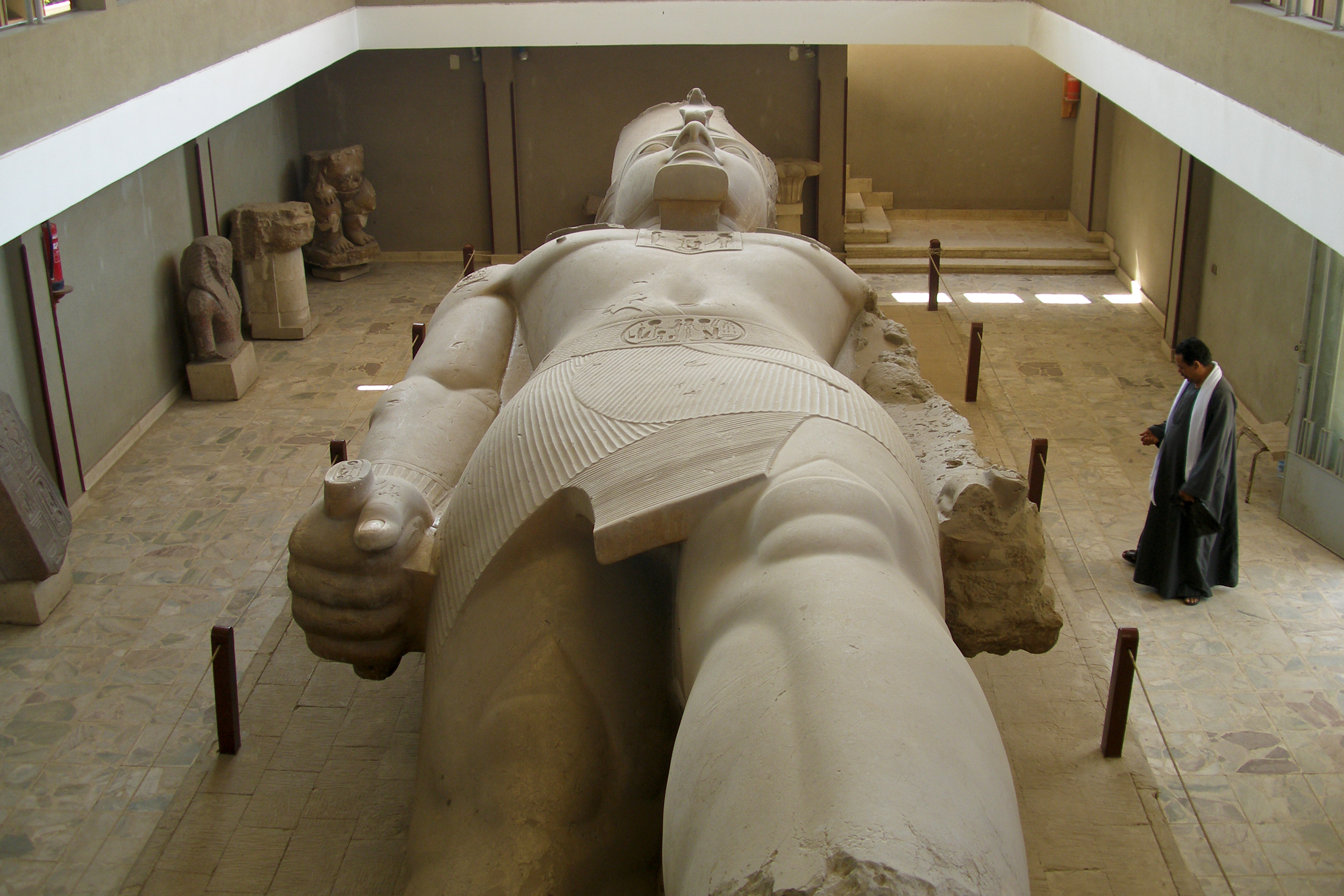
The colossal statue of Ramses II in the museum specially made at Memphis

In 1820, Caviglia resumed his research. During excavations carried out on behalf of the British in the ancient capital of Memphis, about 20 km south of Cairo, he made another important discovery: the Colossus of Ramses II. This huge statue of limestone was found near the south gate of the Temple of Ptah, near the village of Mit Rahina. Despite missing its feet, the statue measured over 10 meters tall. The statue was offered, through the Egyptologist Ippolito Rosellini, to Grand Duke Leopold II of Tuscany who refused the offer due to the difficulties and cost involved in transportation.

Following this, the pasha of Egypt Mehmet Ali gave it to the British Museum in London, which in turn declined the offer for the same reasons. A museum was then built over the statue where you can still find it today.

In 1835, when he was already 65 years old, the British Egyptologists Richard William Howard Vyse and John Shae Perring hired him as an assistant for their excavations at Giza. The research was carried out using large quantities of gunpowder and took place in the pyramids of Khufu and Menkaure. The collaboration lasted a couple of years after which Vyse fired him.

== Death and legacy ==
Caviglia spent the last years of his life in Paris, where he died on 7 September 1845. In 2002, a two-volume manuscript memoir written by Henry Salt and detailing the results of Caviglia's excavations in the Giza necropolis was discovered in the British Museum archives. The atlas volume, containing 66 original drawings by Salt, was published in London in 2007.

== Bibliography ==
- Usick, Patricia; Manley, Deborah (2007). The Sphinx Revealed: A Forgotten Record of Pioneering Excavations. London: British Museum Research Publications. ISBN 978-0861591640.
