= Nauert =

Nauert is a surname. Notable people with the surname include:

- Heather Nauert (born 1970), American journalist and diplomat
- Paul Nauert (born 1963), American baseball player
- Randy Nauert (1945–2019), American record producer

== See also ==
- Naert
- Nauer
