= Naert =

Naert is a surname. Notable people with the surname include:

- Jean Naert (1904–1962), Belgian racing cyclist
- Koen Naert (born 1989), Belgian athlete
- Philippe Naert (born 1943), Belgian organizational theorist

== See also ==
- Nauert
