= Kom al-Ahmar Necropolis =

Ancient burial site in Nekhen, Egypt

Coordinates: 25.0866°N 32.7726°E

The Kom al-Ahmar Necropolis is a necropolis in the southern area of Nekhen, Egypt. Its discovery, by a joint US–Egyptian team, was announced on April 21, 2005. The complex dates to the Amratian culture around 3600 BC. The remains of seven people have been found, four of whom may have been sacrificed. It is believed that the complex belonged to one or more rulers of Nekhen, who lived around 3700 BC when Nekhen was the largest city on the Nile.

The site contains some of the oldest samples of mummification, as well as burial masks made of clay and animals buried as if they were human beings.

== Findings ==
In 2025, archaeologists announced the discovery of an ancient industrial complex dating to the 5th century BC and a Roman-era cemetery. The multi-room industrial building, uncovered by a joint Egyptian–Italian mission from the Supreme Council of Antiquities and the University of Padua, comprises at least six chambers used for activities including large-scale fish processing, production of metal and stone tools, and manufacture of faience amulets, as evidenced by approximately 9,700 fish bones, unfinished limestone statues, and artefacts recovered during excavation. Imported Greek pottery and amphorae indicate extensive regional trade connections during the Late Period and early Ptolemaic era. Adjacent to the industrial remains, part of a Roman cemetery was found with varied burial types including simple ground burials, interments in pottery coffins, and child burials in large amphorae containing the remains of 23 individuals of differing ages and sexes, with bioarchaeological analysis underway to assess diet, health, and lifestyles.
