= Temple of Ptah (Karnak) =

Ancient Egyptian shrine

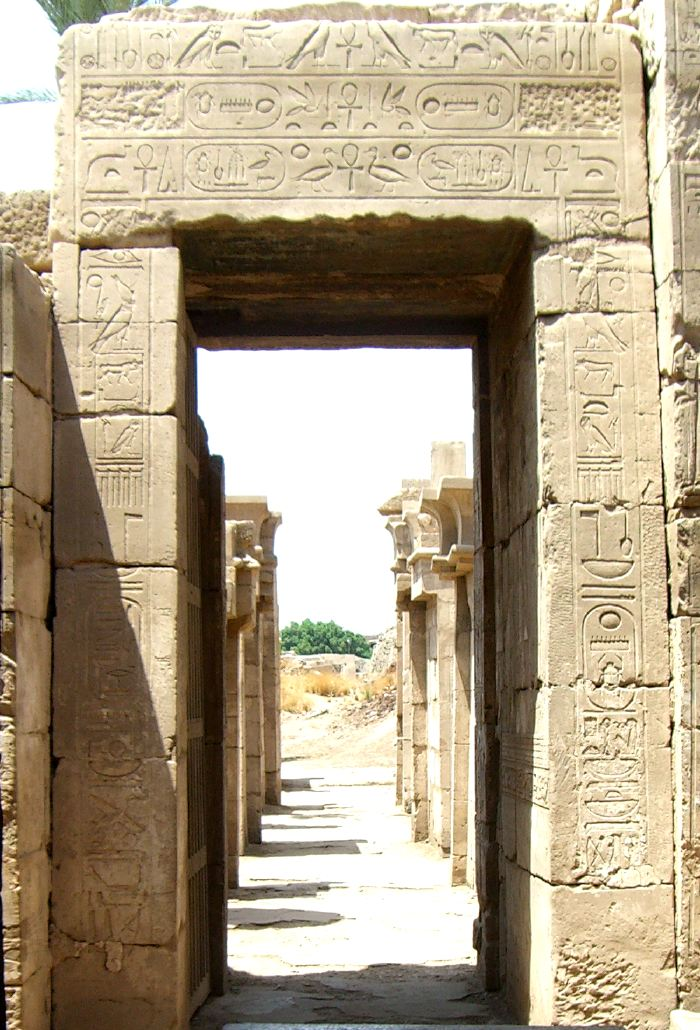
- Doorway of Thutmose III
- Interactive map of the Temple of Ptah area

General information
- Type: Temple
- Location: Luxor, Luxor Governorate, Egypt
- Coordinates: 25.7196°N 32.6597°E
- Year built: c. 1750 BC

The Temple of Ptah is a shrine located within the large Precinct of Amun-Re at Karnak, in Luxor, Egypt. It lies to the north of the main Amun temple, just within the boundary wall. The building was erected by the Pharaoh Thutmose III on the site of an earlier Middle Kingdom temple. The edifice was later enlarged by the Ptolemaic Kingdom.

== History ==
This temple is a shrine located within the large Precinct of Amun-Re at the Temple of Karnak in Luxor, Egypt, dedicated to the ancient Egyptian god Ptah, his wife Sekhmet the goddess of war, and his son Nefertem. The temple was built in the Middle Kingdom, approximately in the 18th century BC, and additions were made by Thutmose III in the 15th century BC, during the New Kingdom. The temple underwent successive restorations restored by Shabaka in the 8th century BC, by the Ptolemies in the last centuries BC, and under the Roman emperor Tiberius in the 1st century AD.

== Gateways ==
The temple consists of six small gateways built close together. The first, to the west, was constructed by the Ptolemies. The second gateway is a replica of the first but much more enclosed. The third gateway incorporates two engaged columns that connects with the fourth gateway. The fifth gateway serves as the entrance to the portico of four Composite order columns. The sixth gateway crosses through the pylons and runs through directly into the central sanctuary, where the statue of Ptah stands. The sanctuaries of Ptah and Sekhmet are situated here.

== Inscriptions and artworks ==
The first gateway crosses an enclosed cartouche of Ptolemy VI. On the interior façade of the first gateway are passages of Ptolemy XI and Ptolemy XIII. The jambs next to the first gateway depict Nefertem bearing a blue lotus flower.

The second and fourth gateways contain cartouches in the name of Shabaka. The third gateway cartouche is in the name of Ptolemy XIII. The fifth gateway leading to the portico columns of Ptolemy III contains the title of Thutmose III and on the gate contains the name of Ptolemy III.

The sixth gateway is the entrance to the sanctuary. This is where the doorpost of the pylon extends beyond the doors. There is a scene of the king wearing the white crown. On the north side the king wears the red crown. On the south wall of the main central chamber scenes in sunk relief can be seen. On the right is a scene of the scepter of Amun with four vertical lines and more inscriptions.

Inside the sanctuary stand two statues. The sanctuary is the most sacred place in the temple, which is why statues of Ptah and another of Sekhmet stand here. Sekhmet's statue in the chapel is dedicated to the goddess Hathor.

Behind the statue of Ptah, Khonsu holds scepters in his hands: the djed pillar, was scepter, ankh, heka scepter, and nekhakha scepter. There are numerous painting of scenes of the king, showing offering with the sign of Ma'at to the god Amun Re. "The back, outside wall of the temple is also noteworthy. Here, at two different levels going from left to right, are a representation of Ptah in light relief, whose head must have been sculpted on a stone that is now missing, and also one of Hathor, followed by two deified scribes from the Old and New Kingdom.

== Renovations and research ==
Most of the renovations were done under the reigns of Ptolemy III and Ptolemy IV, who were generally concerned with changes to the courtyard. Ptolemy VI built on the westward way between the Temple of Amun and Northern precincts of Karnak. Later constructions were done under the reign of Ptolemy XIII, who added a door between the two 25th dynasty gates, which was in turn decorated by King Shabaka, may explain why his name were on doors two and four.

Excavations have found figurines of baboons and the gods Osiris, Mut, and Bastet, as well as stelae marked with the name of Ptah. Since October 2008, an interdisciplinary program has been dedicated to the temple, located on the northern end of the temple of Amun-Re. In addition, "Hieroglyphic, hieratic and demotic graffiti are currently being studied to complete the global approach to researches on the Ptah temple."
