= Dream Stele =

Ancient Egyptian stele

Dream Stele of Thutmose IV
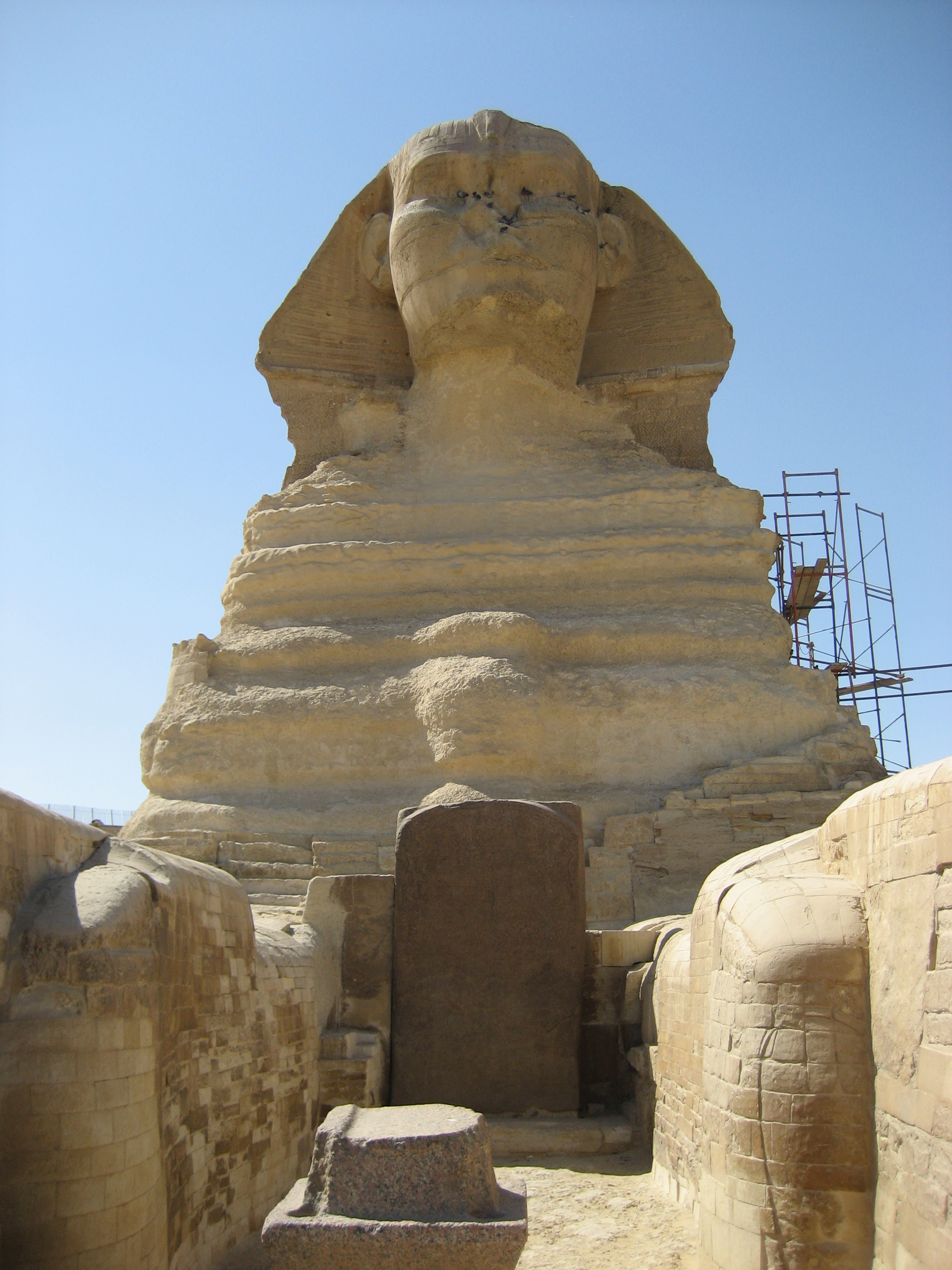
- The Dream Stele, between the paws of the Great Sphinx of Giza
- 29°58′31″N 31°08′16″E
- Location: Giza, Egypt

History
- Built: c. 1401 BC

Site notes
- Material: Granite
- Height: 3.6 meters

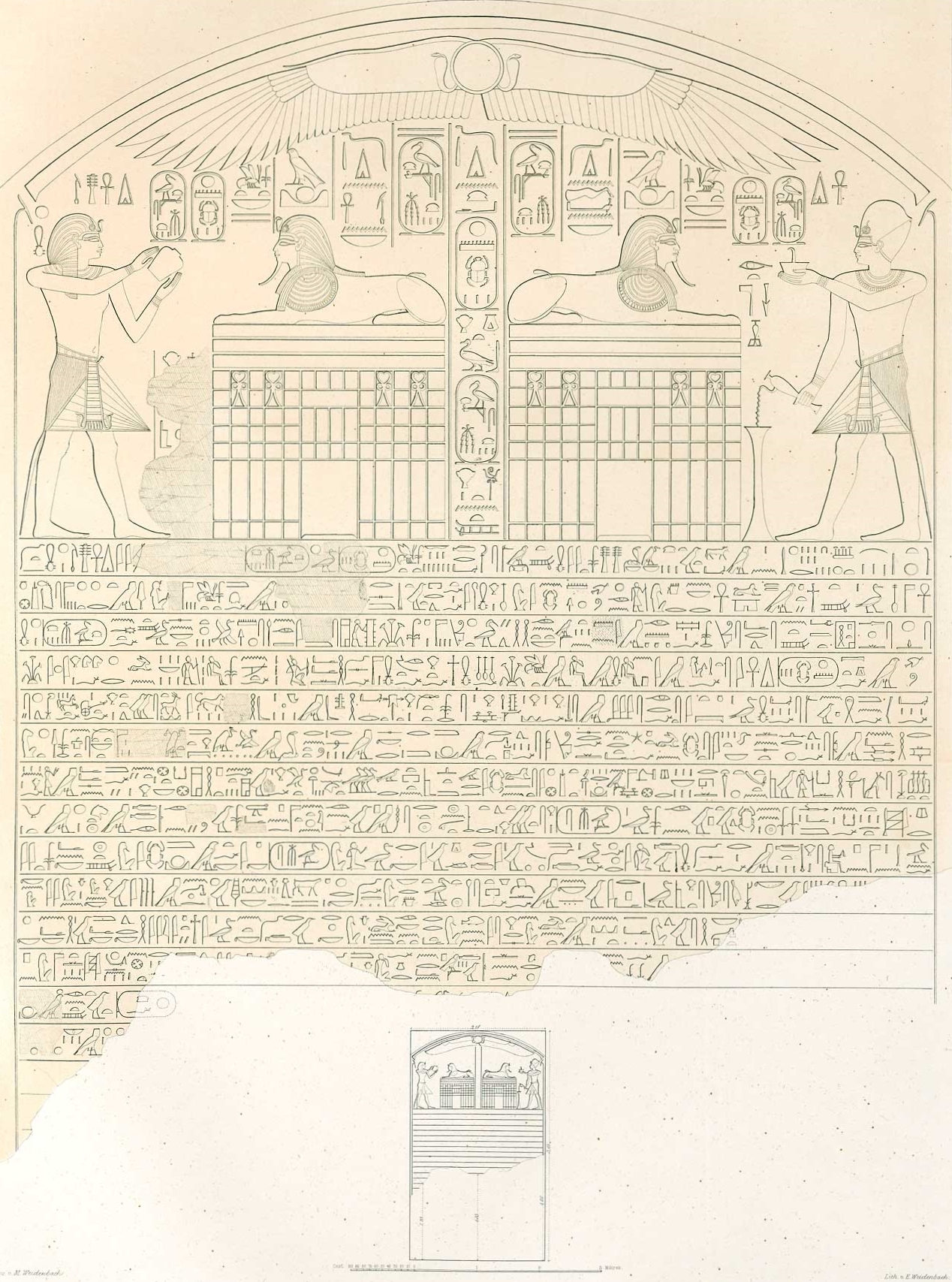
Dream Stele as recorded by Lepsius

The Dream Stele, also called the Sphinx Stele, is an epigraphic stele erected between the front paws of the Great Sphinx of Giza by the ancient Egyptian pharaoh Thutmose IV in the first year of the king's reign around 1401 BC, during the 18th Dynasty. As was common with other New Kingdom rulers, the epigraph makes claim to a divine legitimisation of kingship.

== Location and description ==
The Dream Stele is a rectangular stele made of granite, 3.6 metres (12 ft) tall and weighing 15 tons. It originally formed the back wall of a small open-air chapel built by Thutmose IV between the paws of the Sphinx. It was rediscovered in 1818 during Giovanni Caviglia's clearance of the Sphinx. The stele itself is a reused door lintel from the entry to the mortuary temple of Khafre as pivot sockets on the back of the stele match those at the threshold of the temple.

The scene in the lunette shows Thutmose IV on the left and right making offerings and libations to the Sphinx, which sits on a high pedestal with a door at the base. This is likely an artistic device used to raise the Sphinx above the head and shoulders of the king but it has contributed to the idea that a temple or passageway exists beneath the Sphinx.

== Text ==
The text is fragmented, with a large asymmetrical crack beginning at the twelfth line and resulting in only partial preservation of the following two lines. The stele is preserved to a height of around 4 feet (1.2 m) on the left edge and 5.4 feet (1.6 m) on the right. Given its restored height was some 12 feet (3.7 m), approximately half of the text is now missing. The preserved text runs as follows:

Year I, third month of the first season, day 19, under the Majesty of Horus, the Mighty Bull, begetting radiance, (the Favourite) of the Two Goddesses, enduring in Kingship like Atum, the Golden Horus, Mighty of Sword, repelling the Nine Bows; the King of Upper and Lower Egypt, Men-kheperu-Ra, the Son of Ra, Thothmes IV, Shining in Diadems; beloved of (Amon), given life, stability and dominion, like Ra, for ever.

Live the Good God, the Son of Atum, Protector of Hor-akhty, Living Image of the All-Lord Sovereign, Begotten of Ra, Excellent Heir of Kheperi, beautiful of face like his father, who came forth equipped with the form of Horus upon him, a King who... favour with the Ennead of the Gods; who purifies Heliopolis, who satisfies Ra; who beautifies Memphis, who presents Truth to Atum, who offers it to Him who is South of his Wall (Ptah), who makes a monument by daily offering to the God who created all things, seeking benefits for the Gods of the South and the North, who builds their houses of limestone, who endows all their offerings, Son of Atum of His Body, Thothmes IV, Shining in Diadems like Ra, Heir of Horus upon His Throne, Men-kheperu-Ra, given life.

When His Majesty was a stripling, like Horus, the Youth in Khemmis, his beauty was like the Protector of His Father, he seemed like the God himself. The army rejoiced because of love for him, and he repeated the circuit of his might like the Son of Nut and all the princes and all the great ones...

Behold, he did a thing which gave him pleasure upon the highlands of the Memphite Nome, upon its southern and northern road shooting at a target with copper bolts, hunting lions and the small game of the desert, coursing in his chariot, his horses being swifter than the wind, together with two of his followers, while not a soul knew it.

Now, when his hour came for giving rest to his followers, it was always at the Setepet (Sanctuary of Hor-em-akhet), beside Seker in Rostaw, Rennutet in Iat-Ta-Mut(?)... in the desert (or necropolis), Mut of the Southern... (Neit?), Mistress of the Southern Wall. Sekhmet, presiding over the Mountain, the Splendid Place of the Beginning of Time, opposite the Lords of Kher-ahah (Babylon), the sacred road of the Gods to the Western Necropolis of Iwn (Heliopolis).

Now, the very great statue of Kheperi rests in this place the great in power, the splendid in strength, upon which the shadow of Ra tarries. The quarters of Memphis, and all the cities which are by him come to him, raising their hands for him in praise to his face, bearing oblations for his Ka.

One of those days it came to pass that the King's Son Thothmes came, coursing at the time of mid-day, and he rested in the shadow of this Great God. Sleep seized him at the hour when the sun was in its zenith, and he found the Majesty of this Revered God speaking with his own mouth, as a father speaks with his son, saying: 'Behold thou me, my son, Thothmes. I am thy father, Hor-em-akhet-Kheperi-Ra-Atum; I will give to thee my Kingdom upon earth at the head of the living. Thou shalt wear the White Crown and the Red Crown upon the Throne of Geb, the Hereditary Prince. The land shall be thine, in its length and in its breath, that which the eye of the All-Lord shines upon. The food of the Two Lands shall be thine, the great tribute of all countries, the duration of a long period of years. My face is directed to you, my heart is to you; Thou shalt be to me the protector of my affairs, because I am ailing in all my limbs. The sands of the Sanctuary, upon which I am, have reached me; turn to me in order to do what I desire. I know that thou art my son, my protector; behold; I am with thee, I am thy leader.'

When he finished this speech, the King's Son awoke, hearing this..., he understood the words of the God, and he put them in his heart. He said: 'Come, let us hasten to our houses in the city; they shall protect the oblations for this God which we bring for him (or that we shall protect... and that we may bring): oxen... and all young vegetables; and we shall give praise to Wennefer... Khafra, the statue made for Atum-Hor-em-akhet...'

The rest of the text likely gave Thutmose's response and an affirmation of the works carried out.

== Interpretations of the text ==
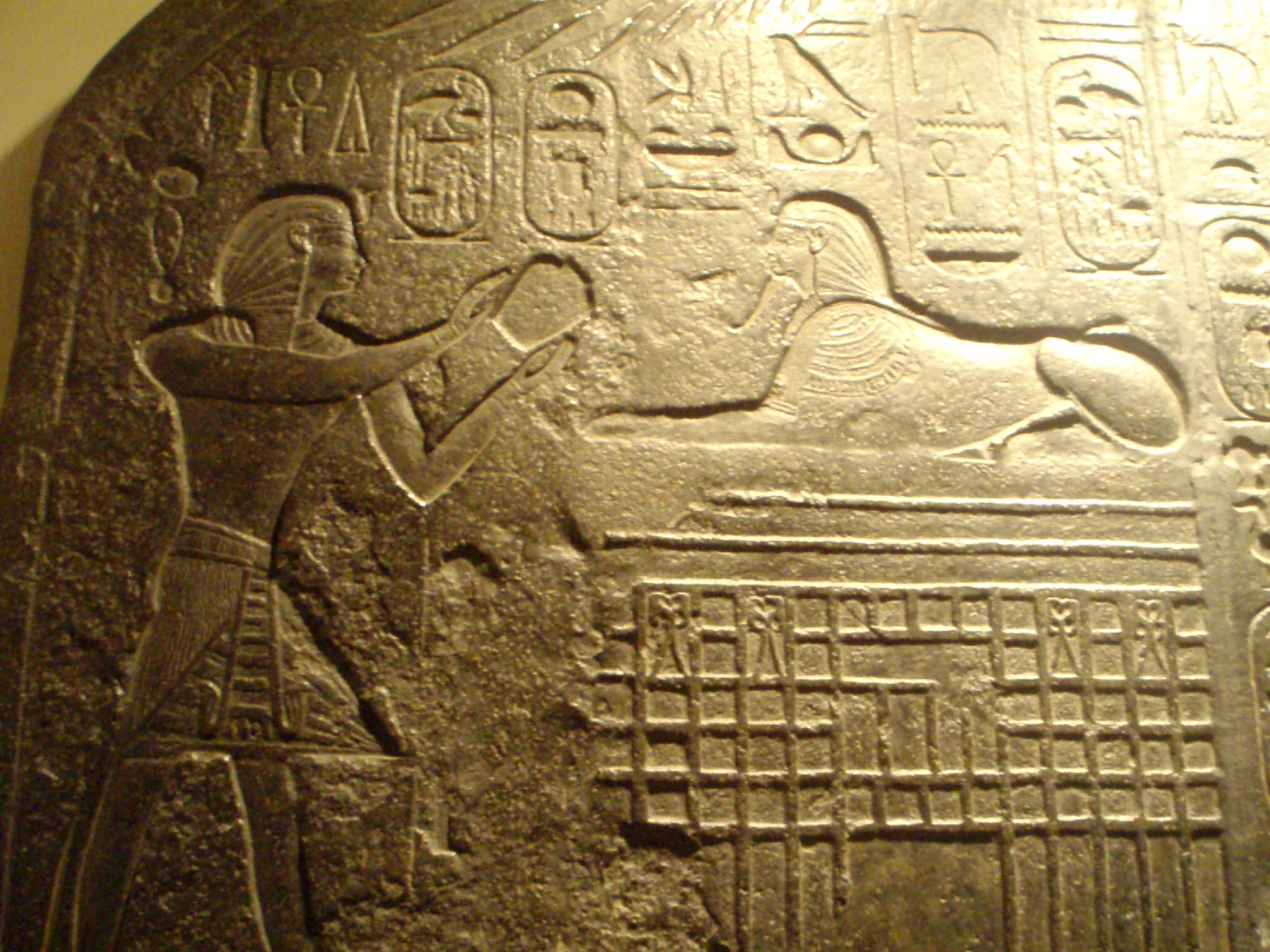
Dream Stele (detail of lunette); reproduction at Rosicrucian Egyptian Museum, San Jose

The Sphinx's promise to make Thutmose ruler of Egypt if he clears the sand has led to speculation that Thutmose IV was not the crown prince (if he was, he would have ascended the throne on his father's death anyway), and that he may instead have seized the throne from his older brothers, with the erection of the stele serving solely to legitimize his rule. This interpretation is based on the find of three finely carved stele (now lost) which depict other sons of Amenhotep II making offerings to the Sphinx; the names of these princes have been carefully erased. Selim Hassan's publication of the stelae (partially composed by Dorothy Eady) was the first to propose this interpretation:

We may suppose then, that these elder brothers stood in the way of his ambitions, and that Thothmes removed them in some way, either by death or disgrace, and then obliterated their names, in order that their very memories might be forgotten... I am afraid that this theory does not present Thothmes IV in a very favourable light, and if he was not actually a wholesale murderer (and there seems to be grounds for supposing that he was), at least he was a cold-hearted egoist.

This characterisation of Thutmose as a ruthless usurper is still influential. However, the divine determination and birth of kings is a common 18th Dynasty motif and was utilised by rulers such as Hatshepsut, Thutmose III, and Thutmose IV's father Amenhotep II on his own Sphinx Stele. Though we can never be sure of the circumstances surrounding Thutmose's ascension, the text of the stele cannot be used as an indicator of his legitimacy.

=== Medical analysis of the text ===
In 2012, Dr Hutan Ashrafian, a surgeon at Imperial College London, hypothesized that early deaths of Thutmose IV and other 18th Dynasty pharaohs, including Akhenaten and Tutankhamun, were likely a result of familial temporal epilepsy. This would account for the untimely demise of Thutmose IV and could also explain his religious vision described on the Dream Stele as this type of epilepsy is associated with intense spiritual visions and religiosity.
