= Mostafa Waziri =

Egyptian archaeologist

- مصطفى وزيري
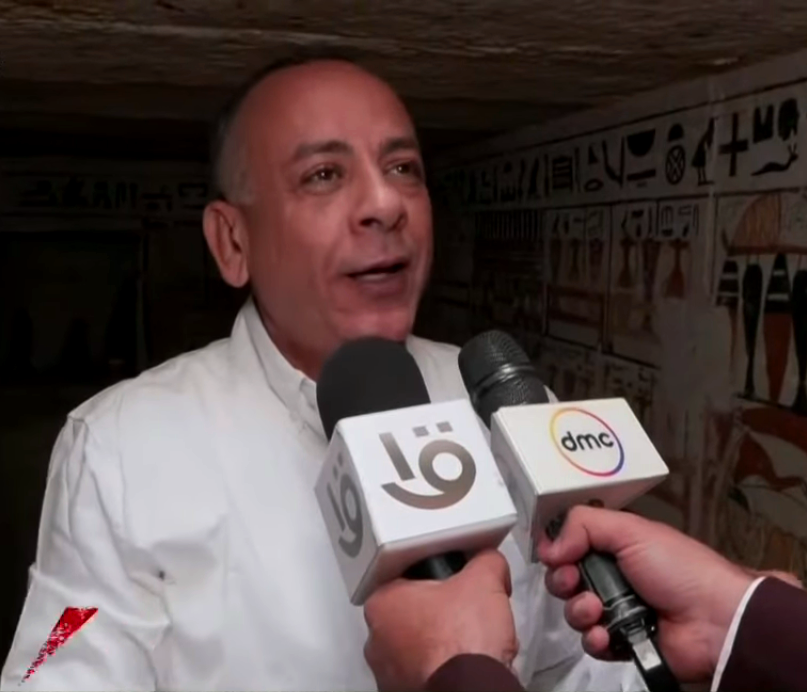
- Waziri in 2022

Personal details
- Born: 1967 (age 58–59)
- Education: Sohag University (PhD)
- Profession: Egyptologist

Mostafa Waziri (Arabic: مصطفى وزيري, occasionally cited as Mostafa Waziry) is an Egyptian archaeologist, Egyptologist, and the former secretary-general of the Supreme Council of Antiquities of Egypt.

He received his PhD from Sohag University in 2014.

== Career ==
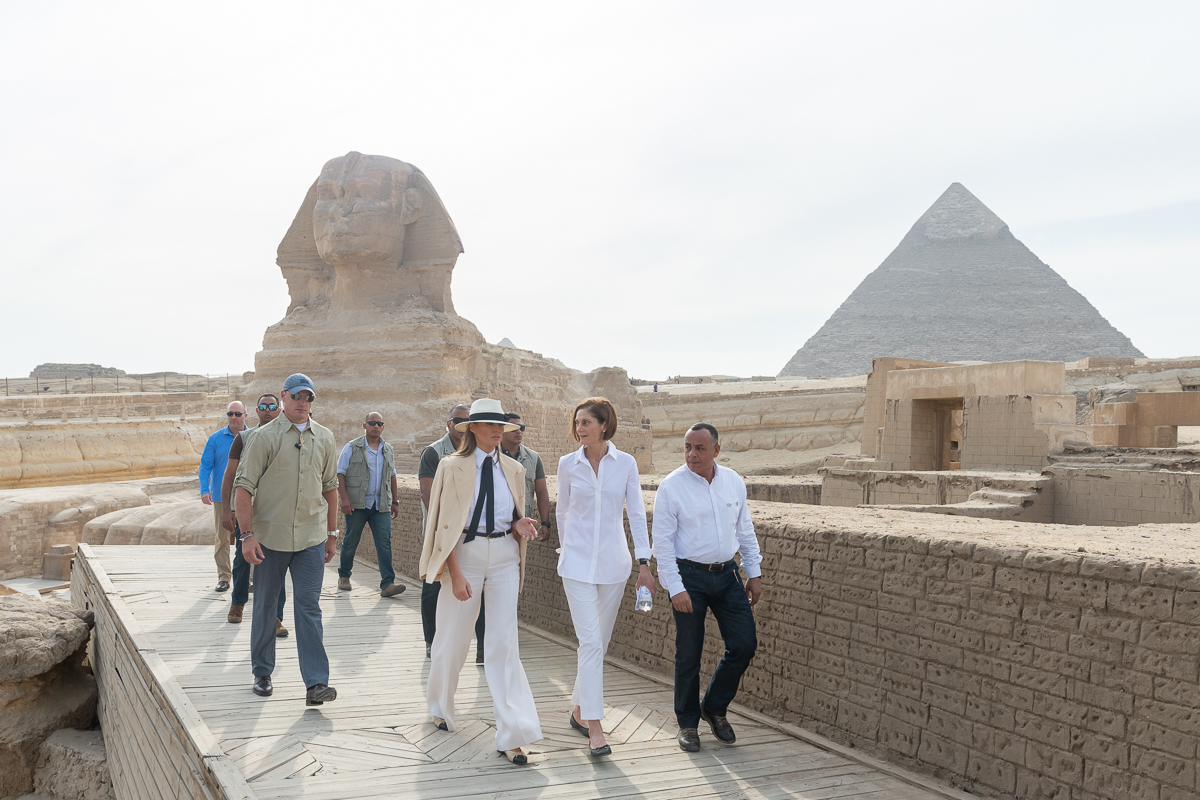
Waziri with First Lady Melania Trump at Giza

In January 2019 archaeologists led by Waziri working in the Kom Al-Khelgan area of the Nile Delta discovered tombs from the Second Intermediate Period and burials from the Naqada II era. The burial site contained the remains of animals, amulets and scarabs carved from faience, round and oval pots with handles, flint knives, broken and burned pottery. All burials included skulls and skeletons in the bending position and were not very well-preserved.

In April 2019, the archaeological mission of the Ministry of Antiquities led by Waziri uncovered a tomb of a nobleman called Toutou and his wife at the Al-Dayabat archaeological site in the Sohag Governorate, dating back to the Ptolemaic era. The tomb contained two tiny rooms with two limestone sarcophagi. Besides the well preserved mummies, mummified animals and birds including falcons, eagles, cats, dogs and shrews were also revealed in the tomb.

In January 2020, Egypt’s Minister of Tourism and Antiquities announced the discovery of the collective graves of senior officials and high clergies of the god Thoth in Tuna el-Gebel in Minya. An archaeological mission headed by Waziri reported that 20 sarcophagi and coffins of various shapes and sizes, including five anthropoid sarcophagi made of limestone and carved with hieroglyphic texts, as well as 16 tombs and five well-preserved wooden coffins were unearthed by their team.

In February 2023, his team announced the discovery (in May 2022) of what is now called the Waziri Papyrus I, a 16-metre-long papyrus text in the Book of the Dead tradition, found in the coffin of a man named Ahmose. The scroll dates to 350-300 BC and contains 113 spells. It is "considered the largest and most complete papyrus in hieratic script discovered in the Saqqara necropolis." "The name of its owner, Ahmose, is mentioned around 260 times in a hieratic inscription and includes 113 chapters from the Book of the Dead. The text is also supplemented with various depictions and representations such as a scene showing Ahmose worshiping the god of the netherworld Osiris in his shrine." It is now kept at the Egyptian Museum in Tahrir.

In March 2023, Waziri was part of the announcement of finding the North Facing Corridor behind the original entrance of the Great Pyramid of Giza, by the ScanPyramids team.

== Media appearances ==
In July 2023, Waziri appeared in the Netflix documentary Unknown: The Lost Pyramid, directed by Max Salomon, alongside his mentor Dr. Zahi Hawass. The film documents Waziri's 2022 season archaeological work in Saqqara alongside his mentor, Zahi Hawass.
