= Patrizia Piacentini =

Italian Egyptologist (born 1961)

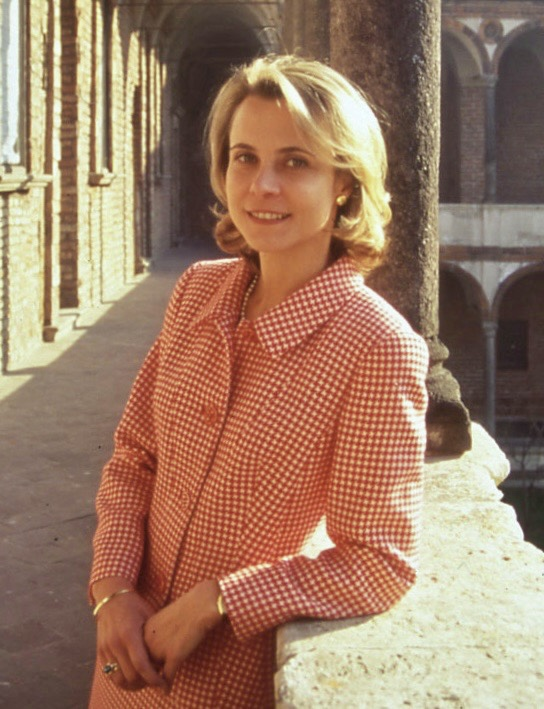
- Born: December 19, 1961 (age 64); Pavullo nel Frignano
- Occupations: Egyptologist, archaeologist, professor

Academic background
- Education: École pratique des hautes études University of Bologna
- Thesis: The Scribes in the Egyptian Society of the Old Kingdom (the Memphite Necropolis)

Patrizia Piacentini (born December 19, 1961) is an Italian Egyptologist, archaeologist, and professor at the University of Milan. She leads the Italian-Egyptian archaeological mission in West Aswan, which discovered a large ancient necropolis. The project under her leadership was recognized with the national Crystal Compass Award.

Since 2018, she has been co-directing with Khaled al-Anani, former Minister of Tourism and Antiquities, the Egyptian-Italian Mission at West Aswan (EIMAWA) in Aswan, Egypt. While excavating burials near the Mausoleum of Aga Khan, they have found ancient Egyptian tombs in the hillside dating to the Greco-Roman era.

She has been a member of the Accademia dei Lincei since 2022.

== Biography ==
She graduated from the University of Bologna in 1986 with a master's degree in classical studies. She received her doctorate in Egyptology in 1997 at the École pratique des hautes études in Paris. Her advisor was Pascal Vernus.
