= Tuna el-Gebel =

Tuna el-Gebel تونة الجبل
- Location in Egypt
- Coordinates: 27°44′18″N 30°42′16″E
- Country: Egypt
- Governorate: Minya Governorate
- Time zone: UTC+2 (EET)
  - Summer (DST): UTC+3 (EEST)

Tuna el-Gebel (Arabic: تونة الجبل, Coptic: ⲑⲱⲛⲓ) was the necropolis of Khmun (Hermopolis Magna). It is the largest known Greco-Roman necropolis in Egypt, dating from the New Kingdom to the Roman Period, and seeing heavy use in the Ptolemaic Period. Tuna el-Gebel is located in Al Minya Governorate in Middle Egypt.

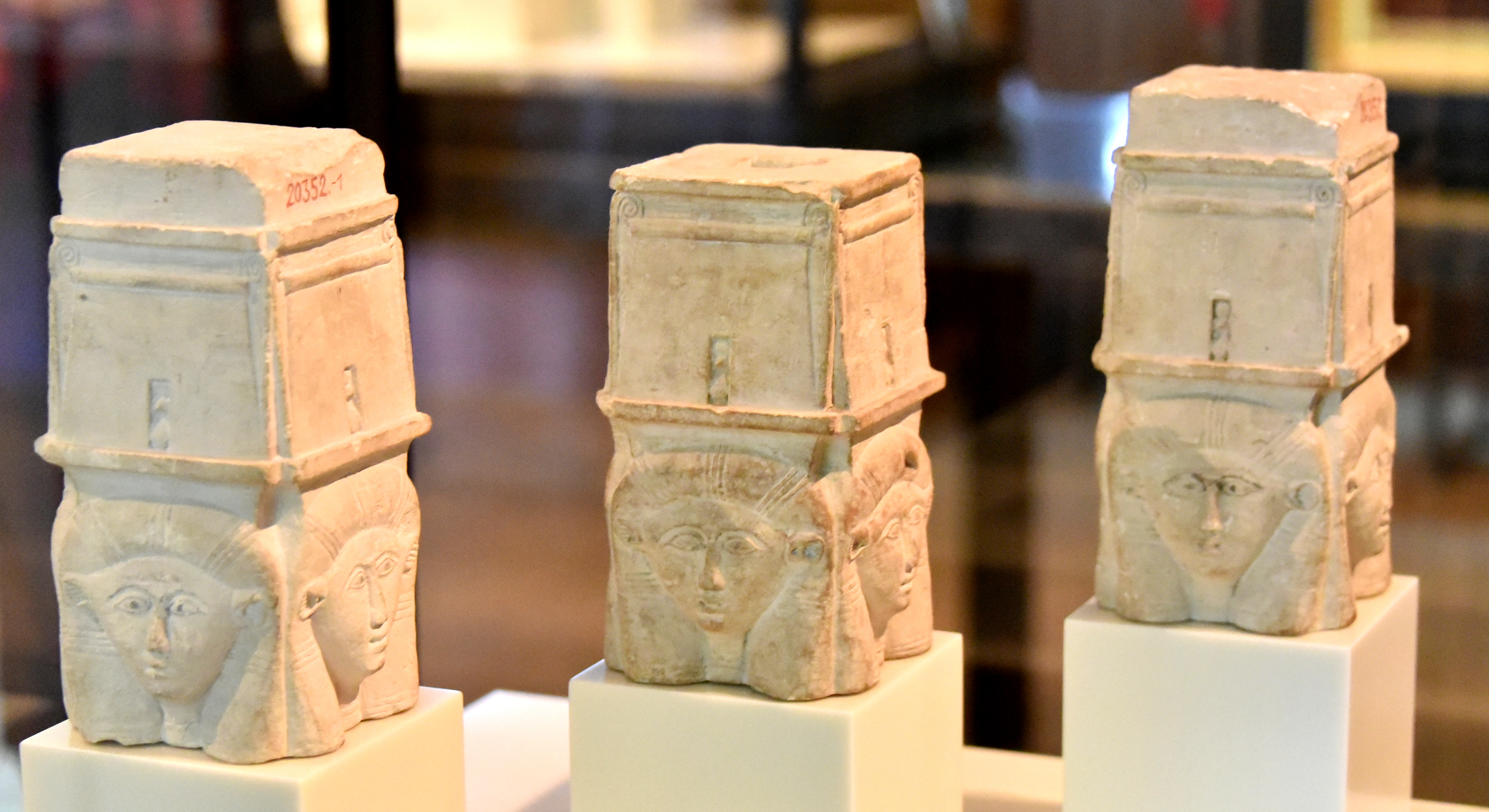
Hathor capitals with a demotic script, sculptor models, Ptolemaic period, 323–230 BCE, from Egypt, probably from Tuna el-Gebel. Neues Museum, Berlin

== History ==
Although most tombs and activities are from the Ptolemaic to Roman periods, there is at least one temple dating back to Amenhotep III. It may be dedicated to Amenhotep III, Thoth, and other local gods. There are also a small number of New Kingdom tombs.

The necropolis in Tuna el-Gebel during the Late Period was mostly an animal cemetery. The most common burials took place in underground galleries and were of mummies of ibises and baboons representing Thoth, as well as all kinds of bird mummies. These were most likely a result of nearby animal preserves or breeding areas, as well as local Thoth worship.

The Ptolemaic Period saw a rise in use of the necropolis. In at least the late fourth century BC, two brothers and priests of Thoth, Petosiris and Djed-Thoth-iu-ef-ankh built the first large tombs. Petosiris built his tomb 200 meters south of the animal necropolis near a temple of Thoth.

Early Ptolemaic tombs were built of large stones with reliefs and smooth surfaces, later stone tombs have smaller stones and intentionally rough surfaces. Though stone tombs would continue to be built throughout the Roman Period, tombs made of mud brick would also be introduced. While some early tombs are in a T shape, most are rectangular. The stone tombs were generally nicer than mud brick ones, and indicative of a wealthier person’s burial.

In addition to more traditional tombs, some tombs consist of either stone or mud brick pillars. They are too narrow to allow a body to be put inside. Many have areas or niches for urns, though some may have their respective bodies buried underneath them.

While the early tombs were expensive and showed off wealth, later tombs were more economical. The Roman period came with tombs of cheaper material and multiple stories for fitting multiple people. Some stone tombs were even used as mass graves. Recycling stone tombs was also a trend, usually by placing mummies inside an already existing tombs or constructing second stories on top of tombs. The famous tomb of Petosiris had several secondary burials.

While most people buried in Tuna el-Gebel during the Roman Period were of Egyptian origin, the main burial style was Greek, and got increasingly Greek over time. Early burials had mummies hidden in underground galleries, and later mummies were on the floor, until finally mummies were put on full display. However even as time went on, mummification was extremely popular.

== Noteworthy Tombs ==
=== Tomb of Petosiris ===
The tomb of Petosiris was one of the earliest full tombs in the necropolis, and the most elaborate. It was constructed of large stone blocks and had high quality reliefs as well as underground galleries. Chemical analysis suggests that the reliefs used red, yellow, black, blue and green pigments, sometimes combined to create new colors. During the third and second centuries BC, Petosiris's tomb became a site of pilgrimage, and many travelers left inscriptions in Greek. However, by the late Ptolemaic period, Petosiris's tomb was being recycled to house other people's mummies.

=== Tomb and chapel of Isadora ===
Isadora was a wealthy and beautiful young woman living in Hermopolis during the time when the Roman emperor Antoninus Pius (AD 138–161) ruled over Ægyptus. She fell in love with a young soldier from Antinoöpolis (current Sheikh ‘Ibada), a love her father disapproved of, and so the two decided to elope. Unfortunately, Isadora drowned while crossing the Nile. Her body was mummified, and her father, overtaken by grief, built an elaborate tomb in her honor; featuring a poem of ten lines inscribed in Greek elegiac couplets. A cult was established around her tomb. Isadora's mummified remains are still present, encased in glass, in her mausoleum – a prominent building at Tuna el-Gebel.

== Recent discoveries ==
In February 2019, fifty mummy collections wrapped in linen, stone coffins or wooden sarcophagi dated back to the Ptolemaic Kingdom were discovered by Egyptian archaeologists in the Tuna El-Gebel site in Minya. Twelve of the graves in four burial chambers 9 m (30 ft) deep, belonged to children. One of the remains was the partly uncovered skull enclosed in linen.

Egypt’s Minister of Tourism and Antiquities announced the discovery of the collective graves of senior officials and high clergies of the god Djehuty (Thoth) in January 2020. An archaeological mission headed by Mustafa Waziri reported that twenty sarcophagi and coffins of various shapes and sizes, including five anthropoid sarcophagi made of limestone and carved with hieroglyphic texts, as well as sixteen tombs and five well-preserved wooden coffins were unearthed by their team.

== See also ==
- List of ancient Egyptian sites, including sites of temples
