= Peru-nefer =

Ancient Egyptian naval base and palace complex

Coordinates: 30°47′14.7″N 31°49′16.9″E

Peru-nefer was an important naval base and palace complex that was established during the Eighteenth Dynasty of the New Kingdom of Egypt, and saw use into the Nineteenth Dynasty.

Peru-nefer is, according to Manfred Bietak and Labib Habachi, identified with Tell el-Daba or Ezbet Helmy.

== Overview ==
Originally rediscovered in 1883, Peru-nefer lies on the eastern branch of the Nile Delta. Its position along the river made it strategically advantageous compared to other contemporary ports, many of which were situated farther east and less directly connected to major Nile waterways. The site’s accessibility and proximity to trade routes likely contributed to its prominence as a naval and administrative center. The pharaohs believed to be responsible for Peru-nefer are Tuthmosis III (reigned 1479 – 1425 BC) and Amenhotep II (reigned 1427–1401 BC) of the Eighteenth Dynasty. The site is generally identified with Tell el-Dabʿa (formerly Avaris and, later, Pi-Ramesses) and Qantir in the eastern Nile Delta, an identification first proposed by Labib Habachi and later confirmed through excavations conducted by Manfred Bietak of the University of Vienna, and by the Pelizaeus Museum in Hildesheim.

Although early investigations yielded limited remains definitively attributable to the Eighteenth Dynasty, later work uncovered detailed wall paintings from the reigns of Tuthmosis III and Amenhotep II. These structures contained numerous Minoan‑style frescoes, including motifs associated with bull symbolism, a hallmark of Minoan art. Bietak has argued that these discoveries support the existence of previously enigmatic palace complexes at the site. Additional evidence for international contact includes depictions of Keftiu (Minoan or Aegean) ships, as recorded in British Museum Papyrus 10056, suggesting that Aegean vessels docked at Peru‑nefer.

Paleogeographers Jean-Phiippe Goiran and Hervé Tronchère also uncovered military installations and architectural features consistent with a major naval base that had canals and two large harbor basins capable of accommodating hundreds of ships during the Eighteenth Dynasty. Evidence points to the first harbor having construction work done much later, in the time of Horemheb. The second harbor was just beside two Hyksos palaces (Palaces F and G) that cover approximately thirteen acres, one of these probably belonged to Khyan, suggesting that portions of the complex originally date back to the Fifteenth Dynasty. This placement along a former Nile channel, possibly a seasonal lake, aligns with a passage in the stela of Kamose of the Seventeenth Dynasty, which describes the destruction of numerous ships in a large basin, presumably this same harbor. Peru‑nefer continued to function as a harbor complex into the Nineteenth Dynasty. Papyrus Anastasi III references the site, and pottery and architectural remains from this period have been found in the vicinity.
