= Statue of Ramesses II =

Egyptian statue in Giza

Coordinates: 29.8713°N 31.2164°E

Statue of Ramesses II in the entrance hall of the Grand Egyptian Museum (August 2026)

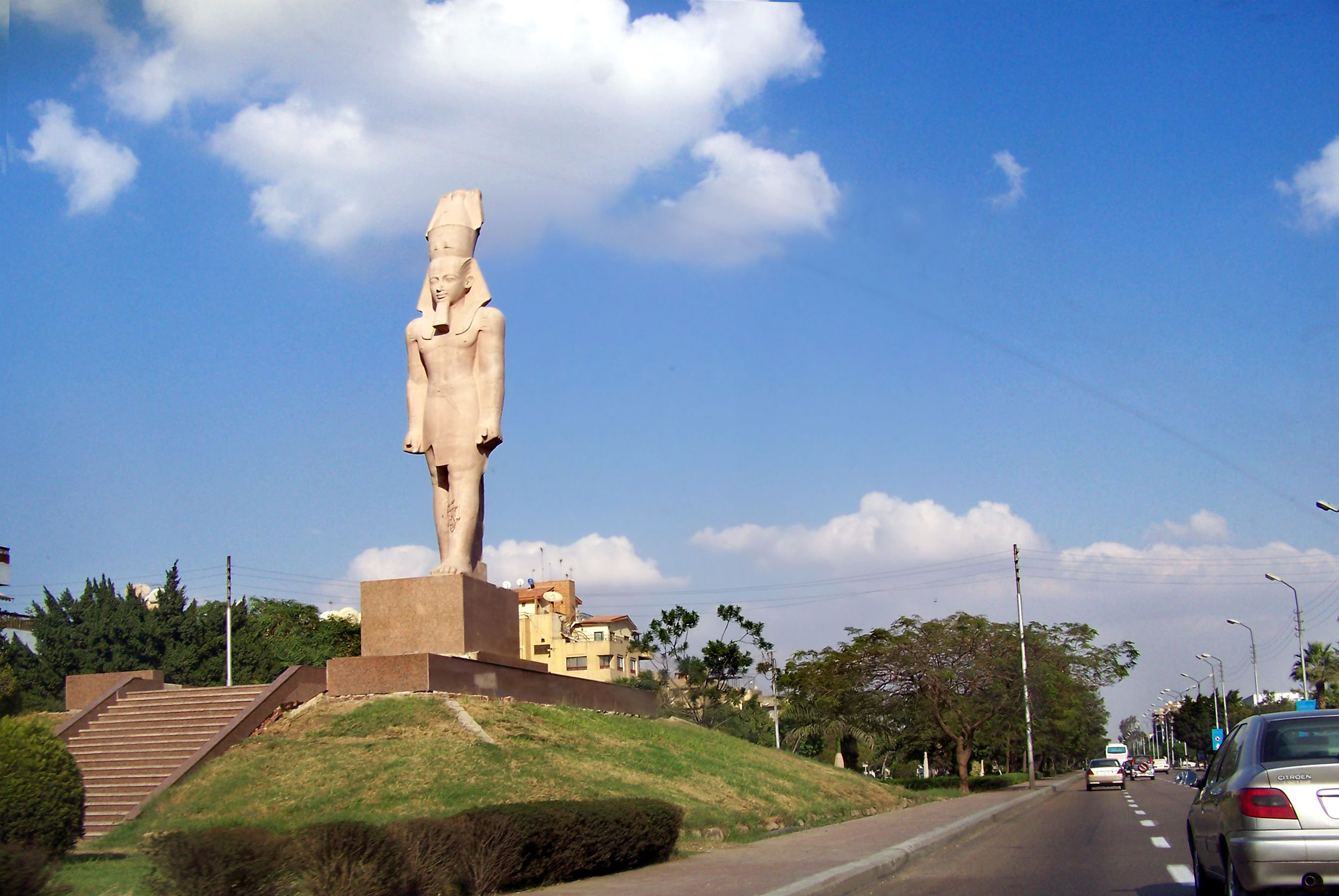
A replica of the Ramesses II statue stands on Orouba street in Heliopolis, Cairo

The Statue of Ramesses II is a colossal 3,200-year-old figure of Ramesses II, depicting him standing. It is 11 metres (36 ft) tall and made from red granite, weighing about 83 short tons (75 t; 75,000 kg).

== History ==
In 1820, the statue was discovered, broken into six pieces, at Mit Rahina near ancient Memphis, Egypt, where it lay for several decades.

In 1955, after early attempts at restoration in situ had failed, Egyptian Prime Minister Gamal Abdel Nasser moved the fragments to the large Bab Al-Hadid Square in Cairo, outside Cairo's main railway station (Ramses Station); the square was then renamed Ramses Square. The statue was restored to its full height and erected on a 3-meter (10-foot) pedestal at the edge of a fountain. It was stabilized by iron bars inside the body.

The statue currently stands at the entrance hall of the Grand Egyptian Museum in Giza

In 2006, the Egyptian government decided to relocate the statue to a more appropriate location, as Ramses Square turned out to be an unsuitable location, where the statue was exposed to corrosive pollution and constant vibration from traffic and subways. It was decided to first move the colossus to a temporary site on the Giza Plateau, anticipating a final move to the Grand Egyptian Museum (GEM) in Giza.

Criticized for its costs and concerns about pollution at the Giza location, the transportation of the statue from Ramses Square to Giza was a technological challenge that had been in the planning since 2002. To test the proposed relocation process, a replica was made and transported along the planned route to Giza several weeks before the actual scheduled move.

On August 25, 2006, the statue was eventually moved as a single intact piece. During its ten-hour transport the statue was wrapped and covered in rubber foam. Two flat-back trucks carried the weight of the statue and its support structures as it traveled in a vertical position.

In 2018, and after some restoration performed at the temporary location, the statue was moved to its current location, 400 meters (1,300 ft) away, in the entrance hall of the Grand Egyptian Museum.

== See also ==
- Grand Egyptian Museum
- Egyptian Museum
