= Labib Habachi =

Egyptian egyptologist (1906–1984)

- لبيب حبشي
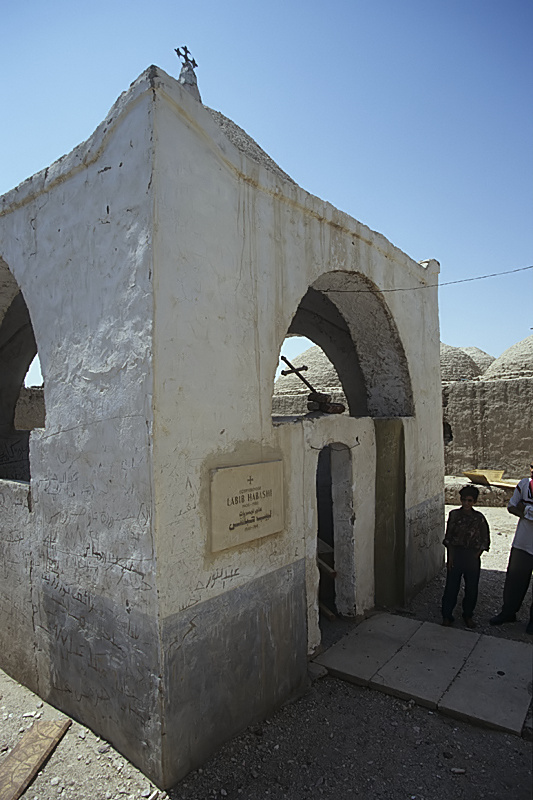
- Tomb of Labib Habachi in Malqata
- Born: لبيب حبشي; April 18, 1906; Mansoura
- Died: February 18, 1984 (aged 77); Cairo
- Resting place: Monastery of St. Theodore, Malqata; Deir el-Moharreb
- Education: Coptic School; Maronite School
- Alma mater: Faud I University
- Occupation: Egyptologist
- Parents: Habachi Ibrahim (father); Mauna Habachi (mother)

Labib Habachi (لبيب حبشي; April 18, 1906 – February 18, 1984) was an Egyptian egyptologist.

Dr. Habachi spent 30 years in the Antiquities Department of the Egyptian Government, ending his career as Chief inspector. During this period he spent an enormous amount of time in numerous dig sites in Egypt and the Sudan. He left government work to accept a position at the Oriental Institute of the University of Chicago as an Archaeological Consultant to its Nubian Expedition.

== Tell el-Dab'a ==
Born to a Coptic family, between 1929 and 1939, Pierre Montet excavated at Tanis, finding the royal necropolis of the Twenty-first and Twenty-second Dynasties — the finds there almost equalled that of Tutankhamun's tomb in the Valley of the Kings. He believed that he found the location of Avaris, and this opinion was widely accepted at the time.

Yet Habachi was not convinced. In 1941-42 he worked at Tell el-Dab'a for the Egyptian Antiquities Service and came to the conclusion that this was in fact Avaris.

When a detailed study of the topography of the site and its surroundings was made by Manfred Bietak of the Austrian Archaeological Institute in the 1980s, Habachi's hypothesis was confirmed. Bietak's mission revealed that the actual Hyksos capital was indeed Tell al-Dab'a.

—

== Works (selection) ==
- "Khata'na-Qantir: importance". Annales du Service des antiquités de l'Egypte, LII(1) (1952), p. 443-562
- Tell Basta. SASAE, cahier 22. Cairo, 1957
- with Henry Riad: Aswan: the town with a glorious past and a promising future. Cairo, 1959
- Features of the deification of Ramesses II. ADAIK, 5. Glückstadt, 1969
- The second Stela of Kamose and his struggle against the Hyksos ruler and his capital. ADAIK, 8. Glückstadt, 1972
- The Obelisks of Egypt: Skyscrapers of the Past. Scribner's Sons, 1977
- with Pierre Anus: Le tombeau de Naÿ à Gournet Marʻeï (no. 271). Cairo, 1977
- Sixteen studies on lower Nubia. SASAE, cahier 23. Cairo, 1981
- Elephantine IV. The sanctuary of Heqaib (2 vols.). ADAIK, 33. Mainz, 1985
- Studies on the Middle Kingdom. Studia Aegyptiaca, 10. Budapest, 1987
- with Zakī Tāwaḍrūs: في صحراء العرب والأديرة الشرقية. الحلقة الأولى. في الآثار الشرقية / تأليف لبيب حبشي، زكي تاوضروس (Fī ṣaḥrāʼ al-ʻArab wa-al-adyirah al-sharqīyah: al-ḥalqah al-úlá fī al-āthār al-Qibṭīyah). Maktabat Madbūlī (Cairo), 1993

Full bibliography in J. Kamil, Labib Habachi.

== Decorations and awards ==
- 1953 Member of the German Archaeological Institute
- 1964 Member of the Institut d'Égypte
- 1965 the Egyptology Institute of Charles University in Prague
- 1983 Honorary Member of the Société Française d'Egypte.
- Egyptian state award and a medal for the first class in the humanities and natural sciences,
- 1959 Order of Merit of the Italian Republic
- 1966 Honorary doctorate from New York University
- 1973 Order of Merit of the Legion of Honour (France)
- 1978 Honorary President of the International Association for Coptic Studies
- 1980 Austrian Cross of Honour for Science and Art, 1st class
- 1981 recipient of Festschrift (MDAIK 37), presented at the German Archaeological Institute
