= Ola El Aguizy =

Egyptian Egyptologist and professor (born 1948)

Ola El Aguizy (Arabic: علا العجيزي, born in Cairo, 17 August 1948) is an Egyptian Egyptologist and Emeritus Professor at Cairo University. An expert in Demotic, she has published widely on the language. Since 2005, she has led excavations at Saqqara, uncovering the tombs of several notable figures connected to Ramesses II. In 2015, her colleagues presented her with a Festschrift entitled Mélanges offerts à Ola el-Aguizy.

== Career ==
El Aguizy graduated with an MA in Archaeology from Cairo University in 1978, and subsequently graduated from the same institution with a PhD in 1985. Her interest in archaeology began as an undergraduate, where she specialised in ancient Egyptian languages. She started working at Cairo University in 1970, first as an assistant, then as a lecturer. In the 1980s and 1990s, she regularly participated in the International Conference on Demotic Studies (held every 4 years or so).

In 2002, she became head of the Department of Egyptian Antiquities and in 2003 Dean of the Faculty of Archaeology. In 2006 she was appointed Professor of Egyptian Languages, a role she held until 2008, when she became Emeritus Professor.

El Aguizy is a member of the Permanent Scientific Committee for Archaeology and the International Association of Egyptologists. She has published widely on Demotic, including a palaeographic study of the language, based on papyri from the collection of the Egyptian Museum.

== Excavations at Saqqara ==
Since 2005, El Aguizy has led Cairo University's excavations at Saqqara. In 2007, during their second season of excavation, El Aguizy rediscovered the grave of the army commander Ptahmes. This grave had already been found in 1859 by Auguste Mariette and partly photographed by Théodule Devéria, although the location had since become unknown. Several tombs from the 19th dynasty were reused as family tombs in the Late Period. Below the tomb of Hwy-nfr was the burial of the mother of a priest of the pharaoh Menkaura.

In 2014, she discovered and excavated the tomb of Paser, head of the military archives, and in 2017 that Iwrhya (also written as Urkhya), general under Ramses II. In 2021 the team discovered the tomb of Ptah-M-Wia, who was the head of the treasury under Ramesses II. In 2022, El Aguizy discovered a sarcophagus in the tomb after being winched in a bucket down a 8m deep shaft.

== Awards and recognition ==
In 2015, her colleagues honoured her with a Festschrift, edited by Fayza Haikal and entitled Mélanges offerts à Ola el-Aguizy, in recognition of her significant contributions to Egyptology.

In 2021, El Aguizy was one of a number of archaeologists presented with awards by the President of Cairo University. Others also recognised with an award included: Ahmed Abdel-Zaher, Mamdouh Eldamaty, Fayza Haikal.

== Selected publications ==
- El Aguizy, Ola Mohamed, et al. "The discovery of the tomb of the Great Army General Iwrhya: A quasi 3D Electrical Resistivity Tomography (ERT), Saqqara, Giza, Egypt." Contributions to Geophysics and Geodesy 50.4 (2020): 425-446.
- El Aguizy, Ola, and Fayza Haykal. "Changes in Ancient Egyptian Language." Égypte/Monde arabe 27-28 (1996): 25-34.
- El Aguizy, Ola. "Some demotic Ostraca in the Cairo Museum." Egitto e Vicino Oriente (1994): 125-144.
- El-Aguizy, Ola. "A Ptolemaic judicial document from Hwt-Nsw." Bulletin of the French Institute of Oriental Archeology 88 (1988): 51-62.
- El-Aguizy, Ola. "Dwarfs and pygmies in Ancient Egypt." Annals of the Antiquities Service of Egypt . Flight. 71. 1987.
