= Khaled El-Enany =

Director-General elect of the UNESCO (since 2025)

- خالد العناني
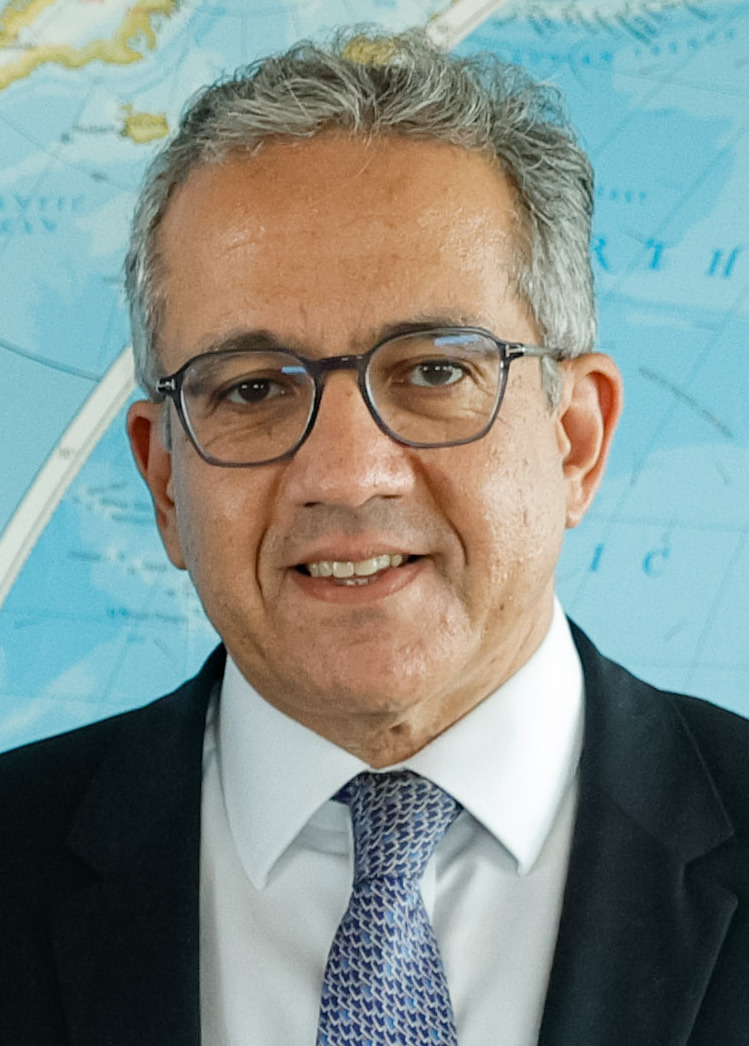
- El-Enany in 2026

12th Director-General of UNESCO
- Incumbent
- Assumed office 15 November 2025
- Deputy: Åsa Regnér
- Preceded by: Audrey Azoulay

Minister of Tourism and Antiquities^{[a]}
- In office 23 March 2016 – 13 August 2022
- President: Abdel Fattah el-Sisi
- Prime Minister: Sherif Ismail; Mostafa Madbouly
- Preceded by: Mamdouh Eldamaty
- Succeeded by: Ahmed Issa

Personal details
- Born: 14 March 1971 (age 55) Giza, Egypt
- Party: Independent
- Education: Helwan University; Paul Valéry University Montpellier
- a. Minister of Antiquities until 22 December 2019

Khaled Ahmed El-Enany Ali Ezz (Arabic: خالد العناني; born 14 March 1971) is an Egyptian Egyptologist and politician who was elected as the 12th Director-General of the United Nations Educational, Scientific and Cultural Organization (UNESCO) in November 2025. He previously served as Minister of Tourism and Antiquities of Egypt between 2016 and 2022.

== Early life ==
Khaled El-Enany was born on 14 March 1971 in Giza, Egypt, and grew up in Roda Island in Cairo. He is the son of an engineer and a French teacher. He attended a French-speaking secondary school, where he passed his baccalauréat in 1988.

He studied Egyptology at Helwan University(now Capital university) and early worked as a tourist guide. He later obtained a MAS in 1996 and PhD at the Paul Valéry University Montpellier in 2001, both in Egyptology.

== Career ==
=== Academic ===
He became a professor of Egyptology at the University of Helwan. He also teaches the Ancient Egyptian language at several universities around the world, including the University of Palermo and Paul-Valéry-Montpellier University. In addition, he became a member of several scientific institutions, notably being a corresponding member of the German Archaeological Institute in Berlin, as well as an associate researcher and member of the board of directors of the French Institute of Oriental Archeology (IFAO) since 2002.

In October 2014, he became director-general of the National Museum of Egyptian Civilisation (NMEC). Between 2015 and 2016 he was director-general of the Egyptian Museum in Cairo.

=== Minister of Antiquities of Egypt (2016–2019) ===
On 23 March 2016, al-Anani became the Minister of Antiquities in the government of Sherif Ismail.

When the government of Mostafa Madbouly was appointed in 2018, he retained his post. Tourism was added to his portfolio during the reshuffle of 22 December 2019, to become the Minister of Tourism and Antiquities.

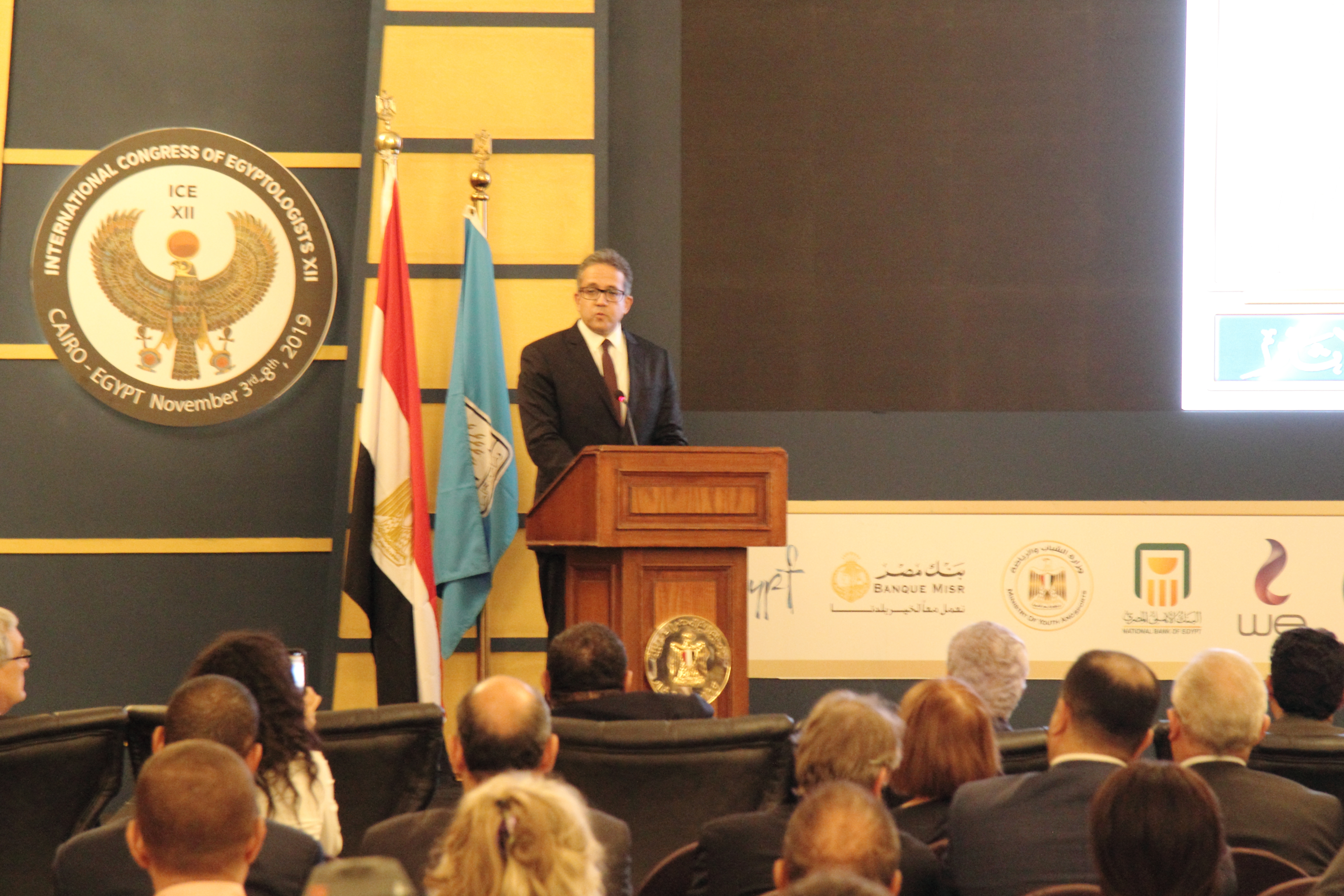
Khaled al-Anani at the International Congress of Egyptologists in Giza (November 2019)

During his tenure, he managed to secure funds to build the Grand Egyptian Museum, and renovate other historical buildings such as the Baron Empain Palace, Graeco-Roman Museum and Eliyahu Hanavi Synagogue. He also oversaw projects such as the Pharaohs' Golden Parade and the reopening of the restored Avenue of Sphinxes in Luxor in 2021 and had to face the consequences of the COVID-19 pandemic affecting the Egyptian tourism sector.

He was replaced by Ahmed Issa as Minister of Tourism and Antiquities in a cabinet reshuffle on 13 August 2022.

He also organises press conferences following archaeological discoveries to promote tourism. In addition, he aims to combat extremism by encouraging the Egyptian population to take a greater interest in ancient Egypt history.

In 2024, he was designated UN Tourism Ambassador for Cultural Tourism. In January 2025, he was designated as the rapporteur of the African World Heritage Fund.

=== Director-General of UNESCO (2025–present) ===
El-Enany was presented as Egypt's candidate for Director-General of UNESCO in 2023. His candidacy was supported by the African Union, the Arab League and several countries including France, Spain, Turkey, Gabon, Germany and Brazil.

On 6 October 2025, UNESCO's Executive Board proposed him as the new Director-General of UNESCO, receiving 55 votes out of 57 and beating the Republic of Congo's candidate Firmin Edouard Matoko. He was formally elected by the General Conference on 6 November 2025 held in Samarkand, Uzbekistan. He became the first Arab to led the agency and the second from Africa after Senegal's Amadou-Mahtar M'Bow, and will succeed Audrey Azoulay on 15 November 2025. Among the challenges he will encounter during his term of office will be the political and financial impact of the withdrawal of the United States from UNESCO, scheduled to take place in December 2026.

His election was criticised by 50 cultural heritage groups and experts for failing to properly manage Egypt's heritage during his tenure as Minister of Antiquities, for allowing, for example, the demolition of parts of the City of the Dead in Cairo and the construction of tourism infrastructure near Saint Catherine's Monastery in Sinai, which are both UNESCO World Heritage Sites. They argued that he was not a fit person to lead UNESCO.

== Honours ==
- France: Knight of the Legion of Honour (2025)
- France: Knight of the Ordre des Arts et des Lettres (2015)
- France: Honorary Doctorate from the Paul Valéry University Montpellier 3 (2021)
- Japan: Gold Rays with Neck Ribbon of the Order of the Rising Sun (2021)
- Poland: Officier of the Order of Merit of the Republic of Poland (2020)

Political offices
Preceded by Mamdouh Eldamaty	Ministry of Tourism and Antiquities of Egypt; 2016–2022	Succeeded by Ahmed Issa
Diplomatic posts
Preceded by Audrey Azoulay	Director-General of UNESCO; 2025–	Incumbent
