= Matoko =

Matoko is a surname. Notable people with the surname include:

- Agnès Matoko, Romanian model
- Firmin Edouard Matoko (born 1956), Congolese diplomat
