= Ministry of Tourism (Egypt) =

Government ministry of Egypt

Arab Republic of Egypt Ministry of Tourism
- Emblem of Egypt

Agency overview
- Jurisdiction: Government of Egypt
- Agency executive: Sherif, Fathy
- Website: egypt.travel

The Ministry of Tourism of Egypt was a part of the Cabinet of Egypt and was responsible for tourism in Egypt. On 14 January 2018, Rania Al-Mashat was appointed Minister of Tourism until December 2019. The Ministry of Tourism then merged with the Ministry of Antiquities with The Minister of Antiquities, Khaled al-Anani becoming the minister of the merged ministry: Ministry of Tourism and Antiquities.

The actual minister of Tourism and Antiquities is Sherif Fathy, from 05 July 2024.

== History ==
Tourism is one of the most important sectors in Egypt's economy. More than 12.8 million tourists visited Egypt in 2008, providing revenues of nearly $11 billion. In 2009, the sector employed about 12 percent of Egypt's workforce.

In 2016, the minister of tourism expressed his concern and optimism about tourists returning to Egypt, despite the downing of a Russian flight in 2015. The minister has said "we are all in this together," referring to terrorism that hurts a country's tourism industry.

In 2018, the UAE Minister of Happiness met with the Egyptian Minister of Tourism to discuss the philosophy of making tourists happy.

In May 2018, the last chariot belonging to King Tut was escorted with a parade to the Grand Egyptian Museum (GEM). It is hoped that the investment in this new museum will stimulate more tourism to Egypt.

== Tourism promotion ==
Before 2018, the promotion campaign was called This is Egypt. In September 2018, Egypt went with a local advertising company called Synergy Advertising for their tourism promotion.

== Ministers ==
- Hisham Zazou, appointed in 2015
- Mohamed Yehia Rashed, appointed in 2016
- Rania El-Mashat, appointed in 2018
- Khaled al-Anani, appointed on 22 December 2019
- Ahmed Issa, appointed on 13 August 2022
- Sherif Fathy, appointed on 05 July 2024

== See also ==
- Cabinet of Egypt
- Grand Egyptian Museum
