= David Cuka =

Albanian-Austrian photojournalist and documentarian

- Born: 1992 or 1993 (age 33–34)
- Occupations: Photojournalist, documentarian, activist
- Years active: 2016–

David Cuka (born 1992 or 1993) is an Albanian-Austrian photojournalist, documentarian, and transgender rights activist. He is the first person to publicly come out as a transgender man in Albania.

== Career ==
Cuka began his photography career in 2016. His photography project "999 portrete" (999 Portraits) was exhibited at Skanderbeg Square in Tirana in 2022. In 2024, he was featured as a part of UN Women's "Imagine!" campaign. Cuka additionally led the "Let My Voice Be Heard #AdvocateForChange" campaign in collaboration with the Anna Lindh Foundation. He is furthermore a board member for Transgender Europe.

== Personal life ==
David Cuka is a transgender man and is based in Vienna, Austria, previously being based in Tirana, Albania. He has had a double mastectomy to remove his breasts, but has not begun hormone replacement therapy, as it is not an available resource for transgender people in Albania. In March 2022, he was physically assaulted with the culprit not being convicted, and the case was dismissed two years later.
