= Firmin Edouard Matoko =

Senior UNESCO official

UNESCO Assistant Director-General for Priority Africa and External Relations
- In office 2017–2025

Personal details
- Born: February 17, 1956 (age 70) Brazzaville, Republic of the Congo
- Education: Sapienza University of Rome; Cesare Alfieri Institute, Florence; Center for Diplomatic and Strategic Studies, Paris
- Occupation: Diplomat; Economist; International relations specialist

Firmin Edouard Matoko (born February 17, 1956) is a Congolese diplomat, development economist, and international relations specialist. He served as the Assistant Director-General for Priority Africa and External Relations at UNESCO from 2017 to 2025. In 2025, he was an official candidate for the post of Director-General of UNESCO.

== Biography ==
=== Early life and education ===
Matoko completed primary and secondary education in Brazzaville and earned his high school diploma in 1974. He holds a Bachelor's in Economics and Commerce (1981) from Sapienza University of Rome, a specialisation diploma in International political studies from the Cesare Alfieri Institute in Florence (1983), and a specialisation diploma in international relations and affairs from the Center for Diplomatic and Strategic Studies in Paris (1996).

He also pursued further training in political science, diplomacy, management, and education policy. Matoko is multilingual: he speaks fluent French, Italian, English, and Spanish; has intermediate proficiency in Portuguese; and is learning Lingala and Swahili.

=== Career at UNESCO ===
Matoko began working with UNESCO in 1985 as an education expert at the BREDA office in Dakar, Senegal. He later served as an international education consultant in Paris (1987–1990), and became program specialist and head of national programs for a culture of peace (1994–2000). He was promoted to Division Chief for Quality Education Promotion (2000–2003).

He then held various representative positions: UNESCO Representative in Mali, Burkina Faso, and Niger (2003–2007), Head of the Quito office and Representative in Ecuador, Colombia, Bolivia, and Venezuela (2007–2011) then Head of the Addis Ababa office, Representative to Ethiopia, the African Union, and the United Nations Economic Commission for Africa (2011–2015).

He became Director of the Africa Department (2014–2015), Assistant Director-General of that department (2016–2017), and finally, Assistant Director-General for Priority Africa and External Relations (2017–2025).

In 2023, He participated in the 25th L'Oréal-UNESCO For Women in Science Awards International Award ceremony, where medals of honor were awarded to three exiled women researchers for their scientific work and resilience.

== Candidacy for Director-General of UNESCO ==
In March 2025, the Republic of the Congo officially nominated Matoko for the position of UNESCO Director-General. He ran against Egypt's Khaled al-Anani and Mexico's Gabriela Ramos.

As an internal contender and long-time senior official of the organization, presented himself as the natural successor and representative of continuity with outgoing Director-General Audrey Azoulay. However, in the Executive Board vote, member states rejected the internal continuity approach, with Egypt’s Khaled El-Enany winning decisively by 55 votes to 2. The outcome was interpreted as a clear signal that most member states preferred change over continuoty and discomtent for Audrey Azoulay and Matoko’s management of UNESCO.

He resigned from his position at UNESCO to focus on his campaign, but lost to Anani.

== Publication ==
Matoko has contributed to debates on traditional conflict prevention mechanisms in Africa. His works focus on development and peace in Africa, Asia, and Latin America. His 1996 book (Africa by Africans. Utopia or Revolution, Ed. L'Harmattan) received honorable mention from the International Literature Prize of the Association of French-Language Writers (ADELF).
