= National Museum of Egyptian Civilization =

History museum in Cairo, Egypt

- المتحف القومي للحضارة المصرية

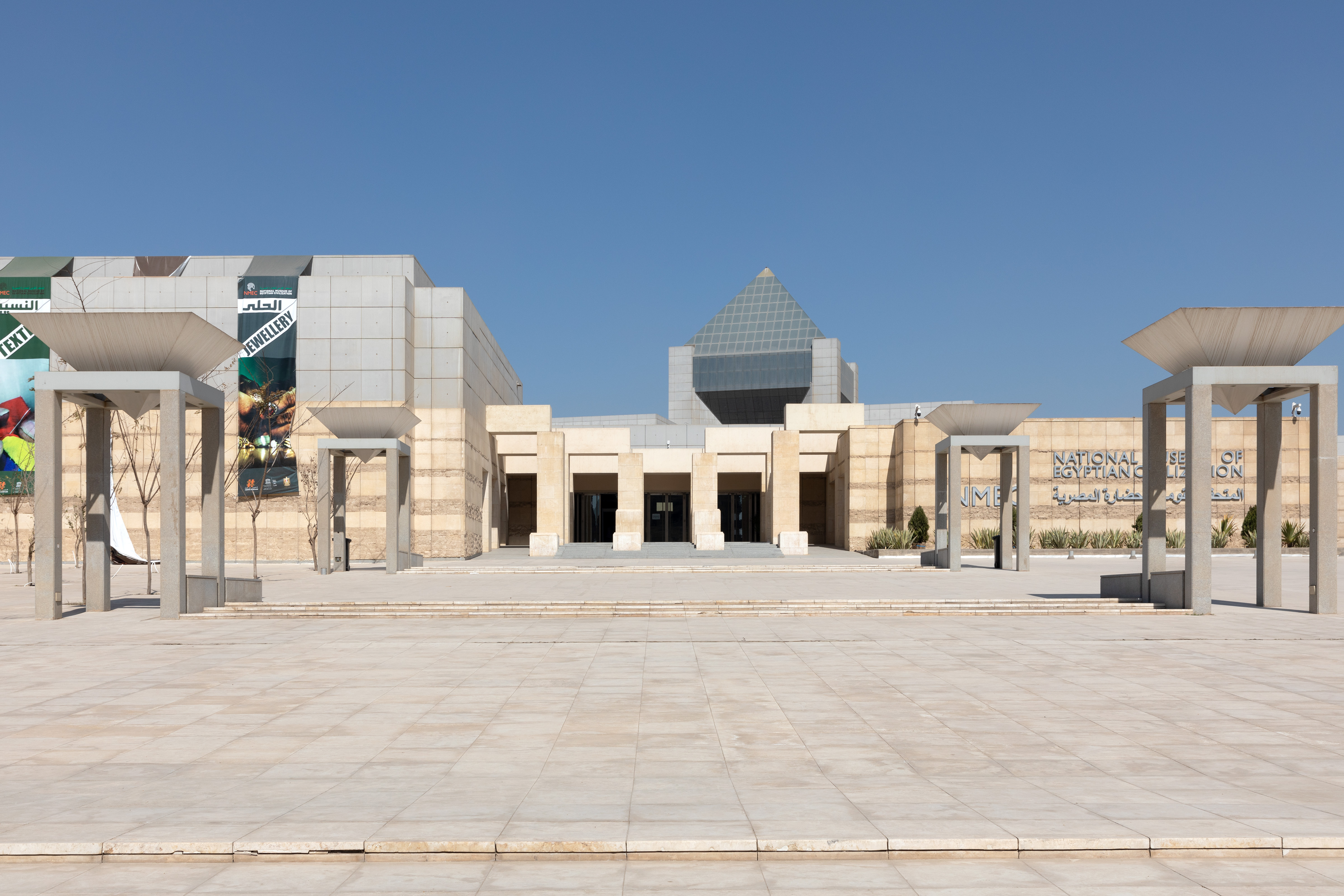
- Established: 3 April 2021
- Location: Fustat, Old Cairo, Cairo, Egypt
- Type: History museum, Civilization museum
- Collections: Prehistoric, Ancient, Greek, Roman, Coptic, Islamic, Medieval, Textile, Modern
- Collection size: 50,000 items
- Executive director: Altayeb Abbas
- President: Sherif Fathy (Minister of Tourism and Antiquities)
- Architect: El-Ghazali Kaseba
- Owner: Government of Egypt
- Public transit access: Mar Gerges Station, Cairo Metro
- Parking: On Site
- Website: nmec.gov.eg Facebook

The National Museum of Egyptian Civilization (NMEC) is a history museum in Cairo, Egypt. It is located in the historic Fustat suburb, part of the Old Cairo district. The NMEC is the first museum dedicated to tracing Egyptian history, from prehistoric times up to the modern era.

Partially opened in 2017, the museum was officially inaugurated on 3 April 2021, with the moving of 22 mummies, including 18 kings and four queens, from the Egyptian Museum in central Cairo, in an event termed the Pharaohs' Golden Parade. The museum displays a collection of 50,000 artifacts, presenting the Egyptian civilization from prehistoric times to the Modern era.

== Background ==
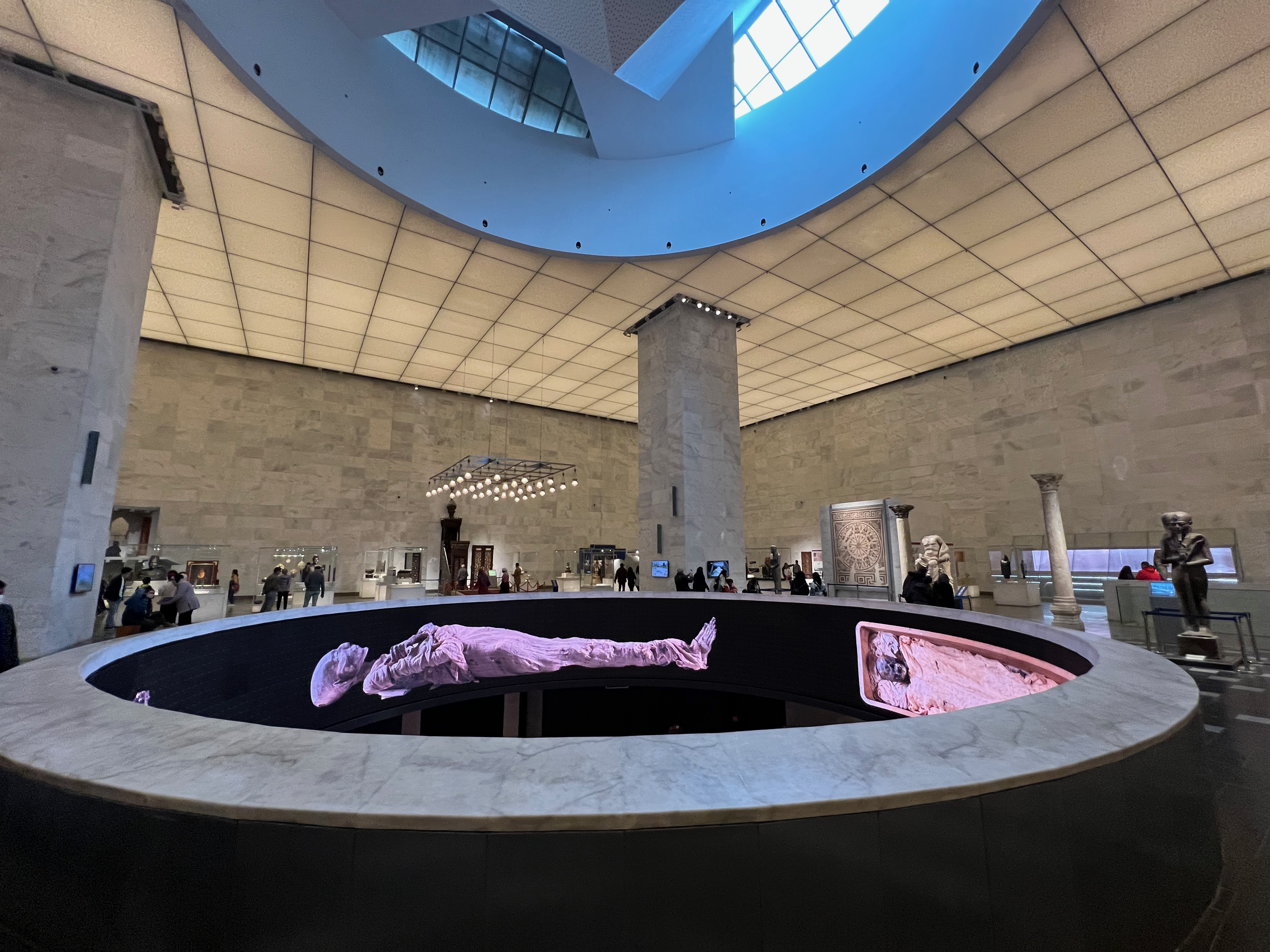
Interior of the museum

The permanent collection is divided into two separate regions; one chronological and the other is thematic. The chronological areas are the following: Archaic, Pharaonic, Greco-Roman, Coptic, Medieval, Islamic, modern and contemporary. The thematic areas are the following: Dawn of Civilization, The Nile, Writing, State and Society, Material Culture, Beliefs and Thinking and the Gallery of Royal Mummies. UNESCO provided technical help to the museum.

The collections will be taken from other Egyptian museums such as the Egyptian Museum, the Coptic Museum, the Museum of Islamic Art, the Manial Palace and Museum in Cairo, and the Royal Jewelry Museum in Alexandria.

== Museum halls ==
=== Main gallery ===
The main gallery helps visitors obtain an integrated idea of the Egyptian civilization and its most important achievements from prehistoric times to the modern era, in addition to the traditional culture that modern Egyptians have inherited. This gallery includes Nazlet Khater Skeleton, the Tent of Purification, the coffin of Sennedjem, the Nilos Statue, Minbar Aboubakr Ibn Mizhar, and the Al Falaha Statue, among other pieces.

=== Mummies Hall ===
The Royal Mummies’ Hall is designed to display the mummies of the ancient monarchs of Egypt. The design aims to give the visitor the feeling of strolling down the Valley of the Kings, where most of these mummies were originally resting. The hall includes 20 royal mummies, 18 kings, and 2 queens, from the 17th to the 20th dynasties.

List of mummies from 17th and 18th dynasties:

Name	Dynasty	Role/Notable Facts
Seqenenre Tao	17th Dynasty	Known for resisting the Hyksos.
Ahmose-Nefertari	18th Dynasty	Founder of the 18th Dynasty, wife of Ahmose I.
Amenhotep I	18th Dynasty	Son of Ahmose I and Ahmose-Nefertari, second ruler.
Meritamun	18th Dynasty	Possible sister-wife of Amenhotep I.
Thutmose I	18th Dynasty	Expanded Egypt’s borders significantly.
Thutmose II	18th Dynasty	Son of Thutmose I, husband of Hatshepsut.
Hatshepsut	18th Dynasty	Famous female pharaoh who assumed the throne.
Thutmose III	18th Dynasty	Renowned as Egypt’s greatest conqueror.
Amenhotep II	18th Dynasty	Son of Thutmose III, known for military campaigns.
Thutmose IV	18th Dynasty	Known for the Dream Stele at the Great Sphinx.
Amenhotep III	18th Dynasty	Brought Egypt to its peak of artistic and cultural power.
Queen Tiye	18th Dynasty	Great royal wife of Amenhotep III, influential in court.

List of mummies from 19th and 20th dynasties:

Name	Dynasty	Role/Notable Facts
Seti I	19th Dynasty	Known for restoring Egypt’s glory after unrest.
Ramesses II	19th Dynasty	Known as “Ramesses the Great,” ruled for over 60 years.
Merenptah	19th Dynasty	Son of Ramesses II, fought the Sea Peoples.
Seti II	19th Dynasty	Faced internal conflicts during his reign.
Siptah	19th Dynasty	Young pharaoh, possibly ruled under regency.
Ramesses III	20th Dynasty	Defended Egypt from invasions by the Sea Peoples.
Ramesses IV	20th Dynasty	Continued temple constructions but faced economic issues.
Ramesses V	20th Dynasty	Short reign, known from the Wilbour Papyrus.
Ramesses VI	20th Dynasty	Faced challenges in maintaining Egypt’s stability.
Ramesses IX	20th Dynasty	Last significant ruler of the 20th Dynasty.

=== Textile Hall ===
The Egyptian Textile Gallery contains a collection that comprises approximately 600 artifacts.

=== Dye House ===
This ancient dye house dates back to at least the first century of the Fatimid period. It is the sole surviving evidence of Cairo’s ancient dye houses.

== Ain el-Sera Lake ==
The museum is located next to the Ain el-Sera Lake, the area which has been developed from slums into a touristic site in 2022. It includes a restaurants area, an open-air theatre, green areas, wooden pergolas, fountains and a purification plant of lake water.

== Gallery ==
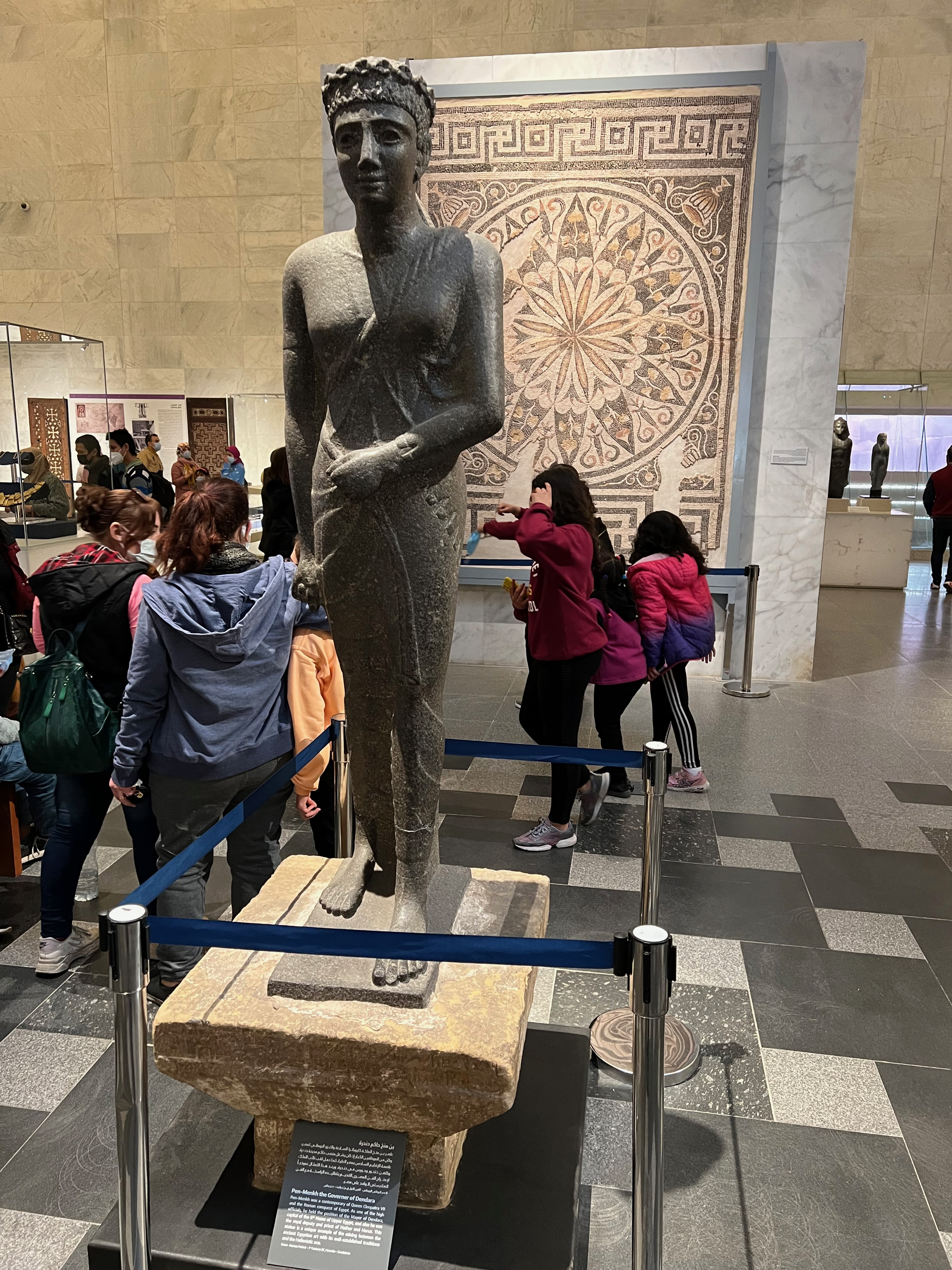
Inside the museum

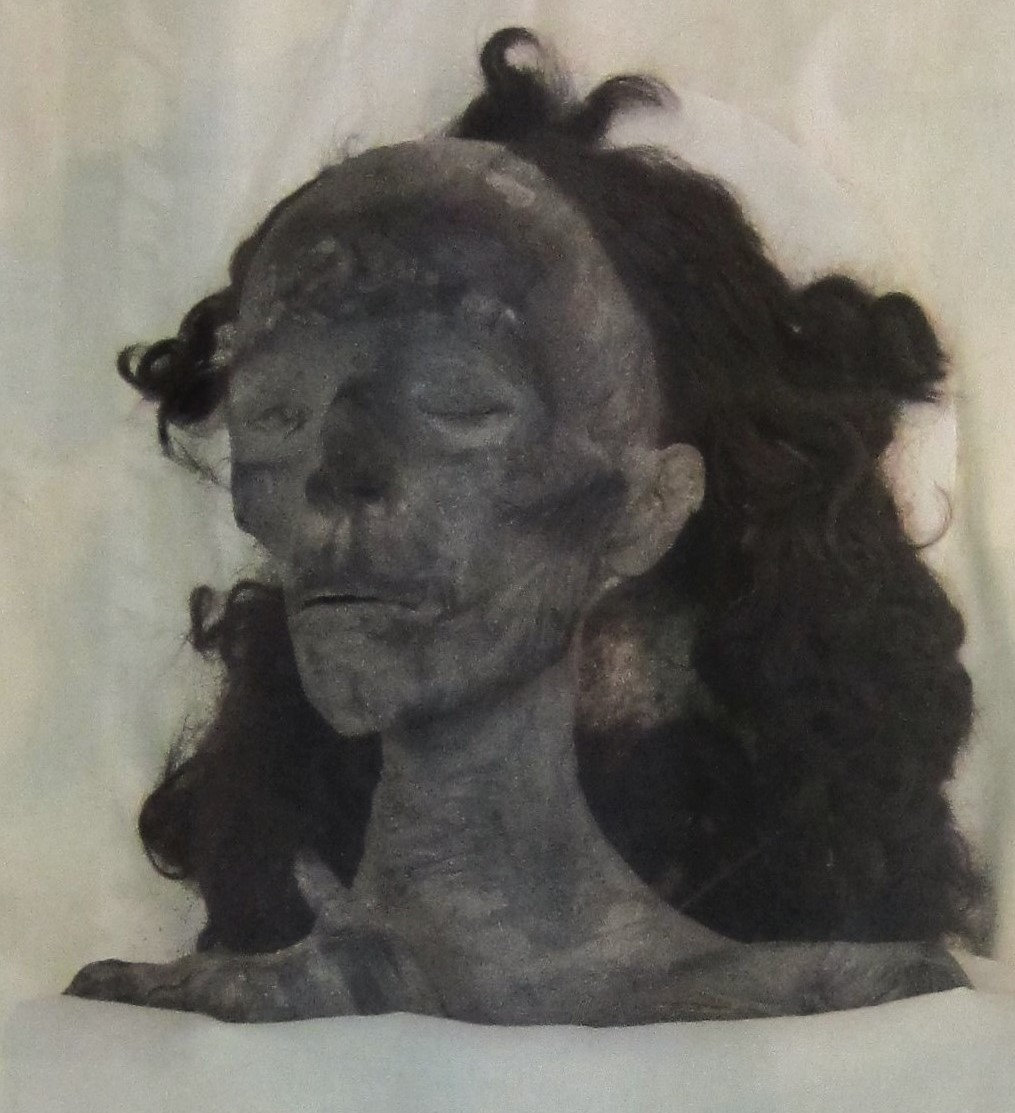
Mummy of queen Tiye, now displayed at the National Museum of Egyptian Civilization

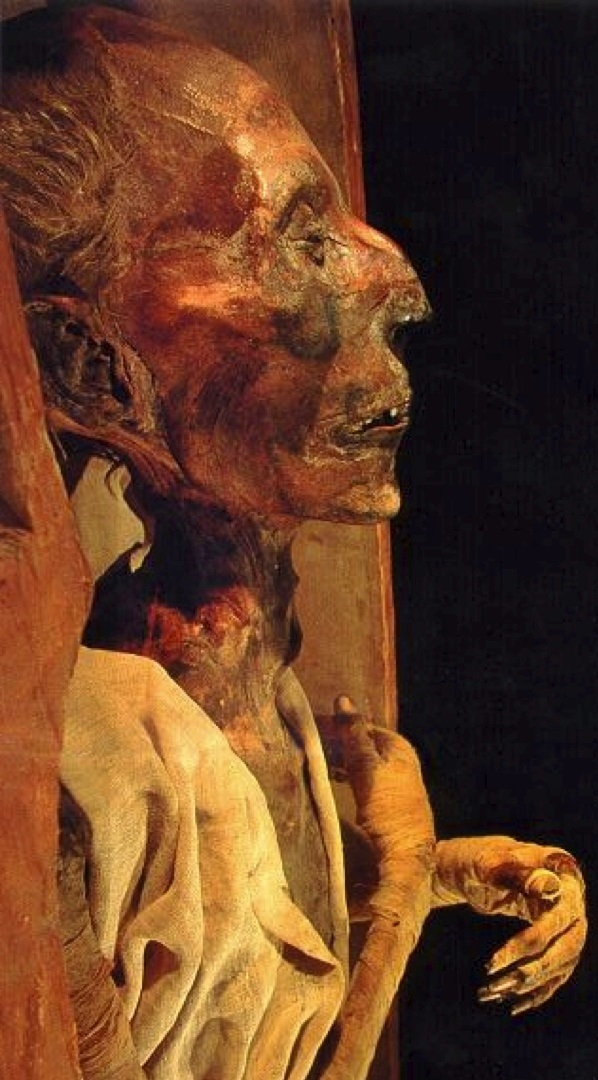
Mummy of Ramesses II, now displayed at the National Museum of Egyptian Civilization

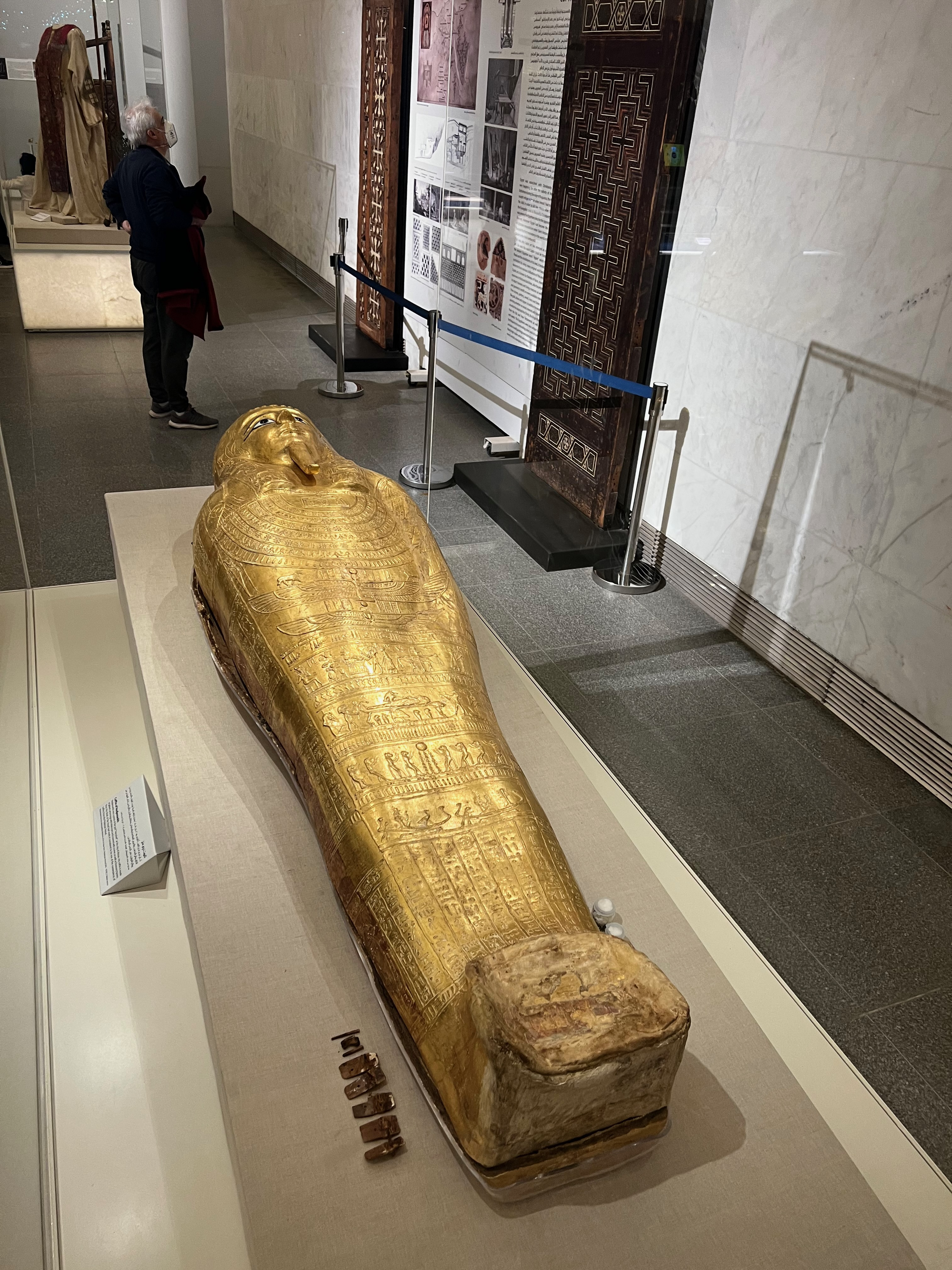
The coffin of Nedjemankh

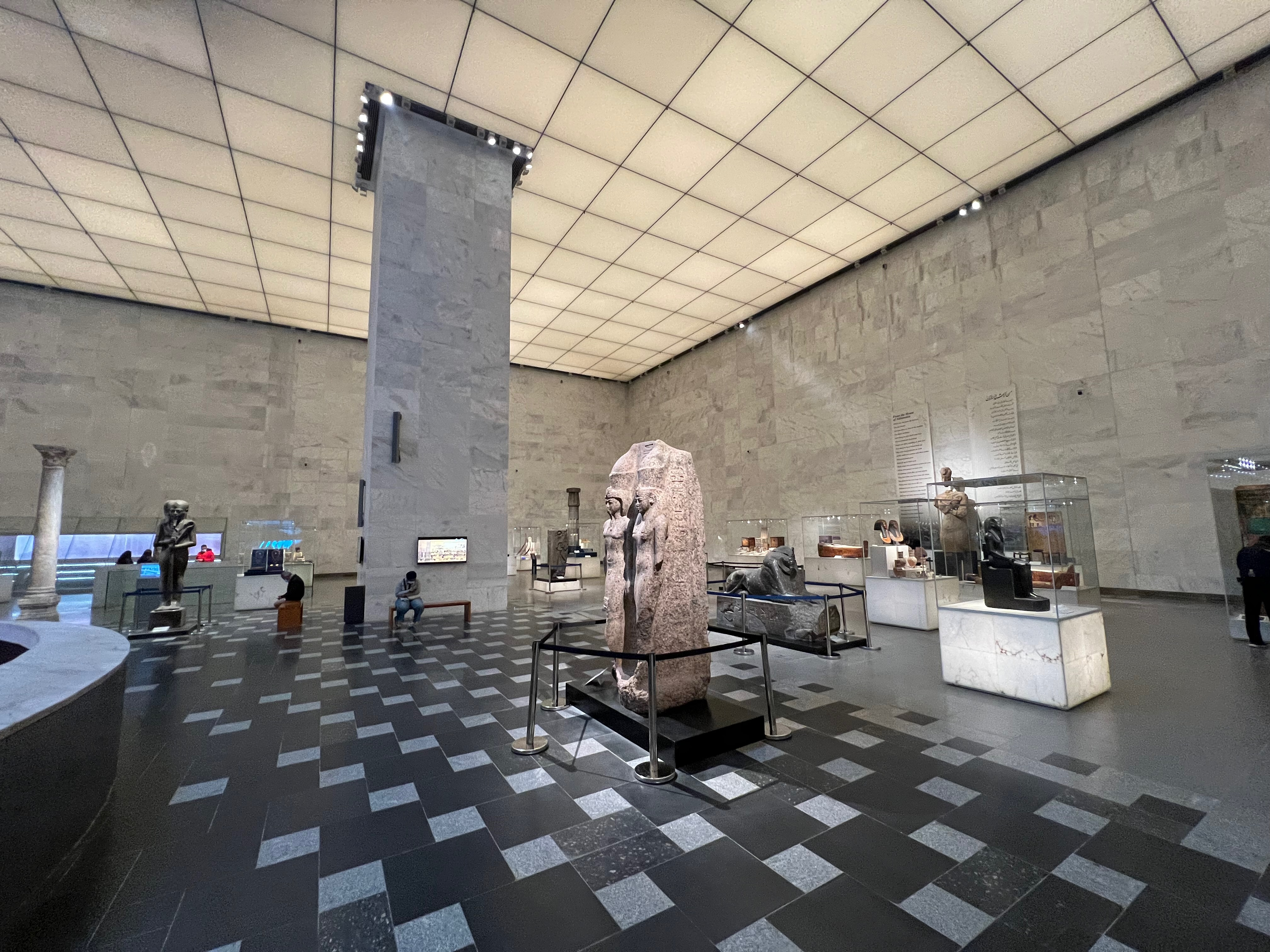

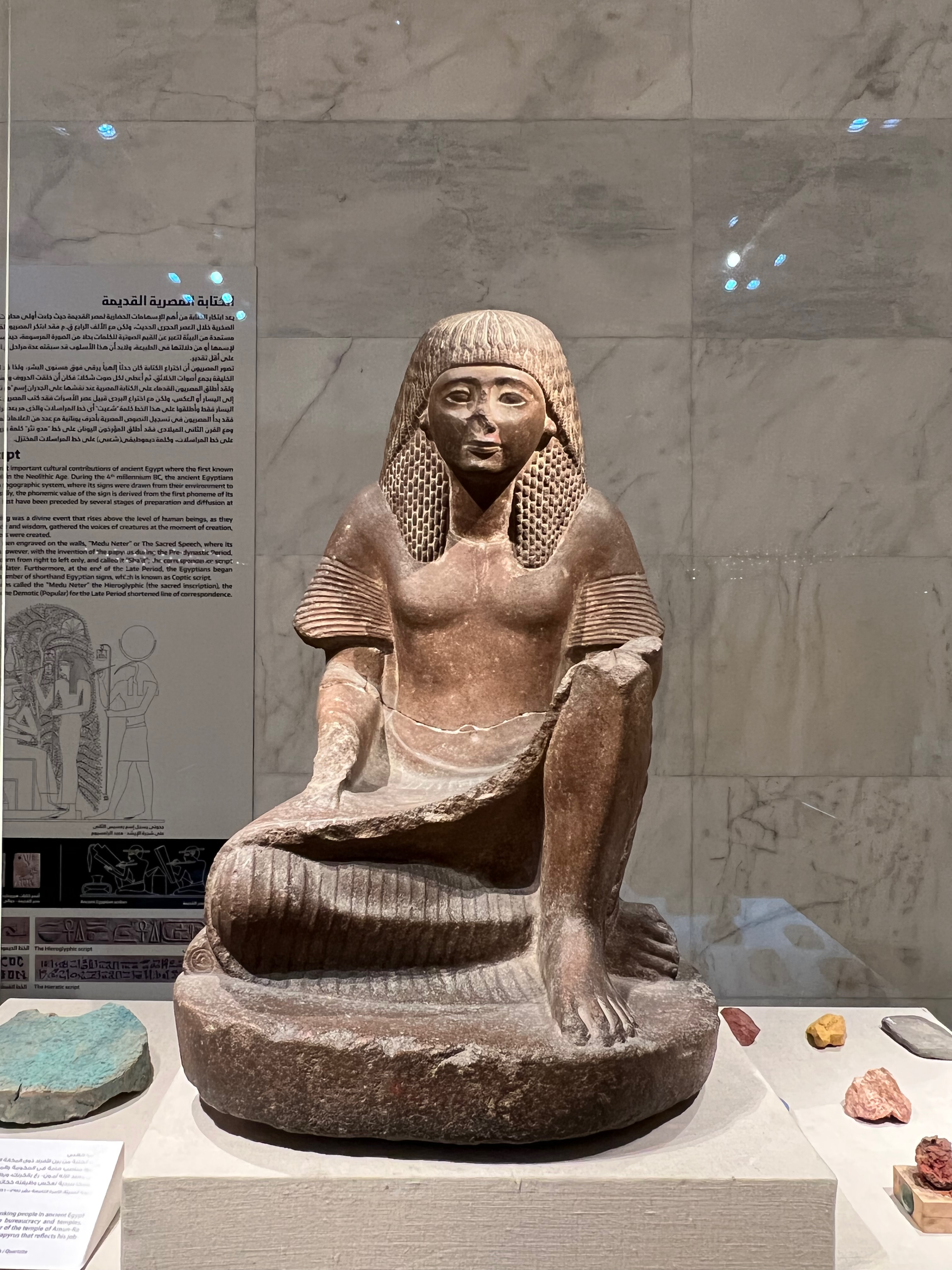
Hapi, the scribe

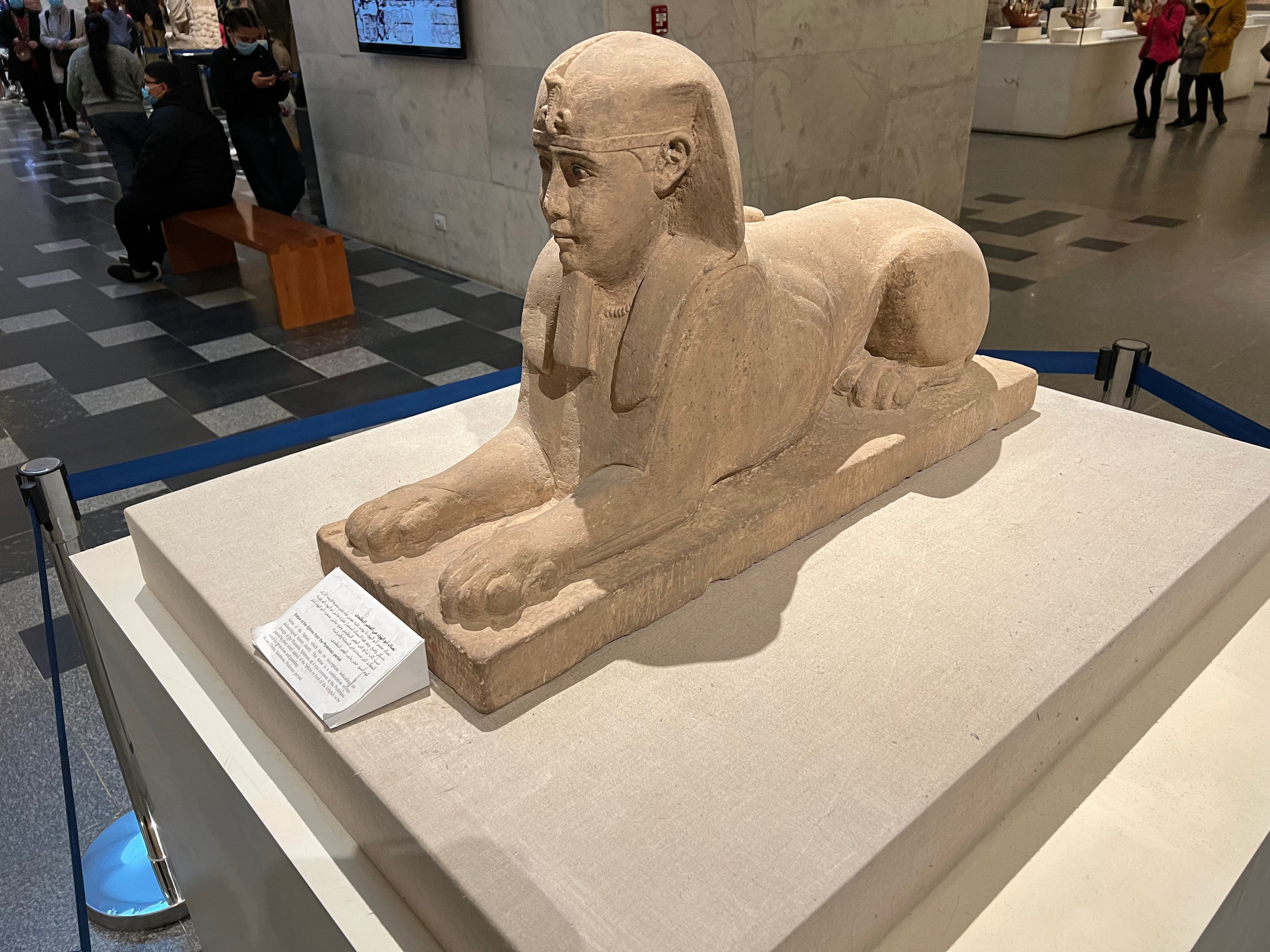

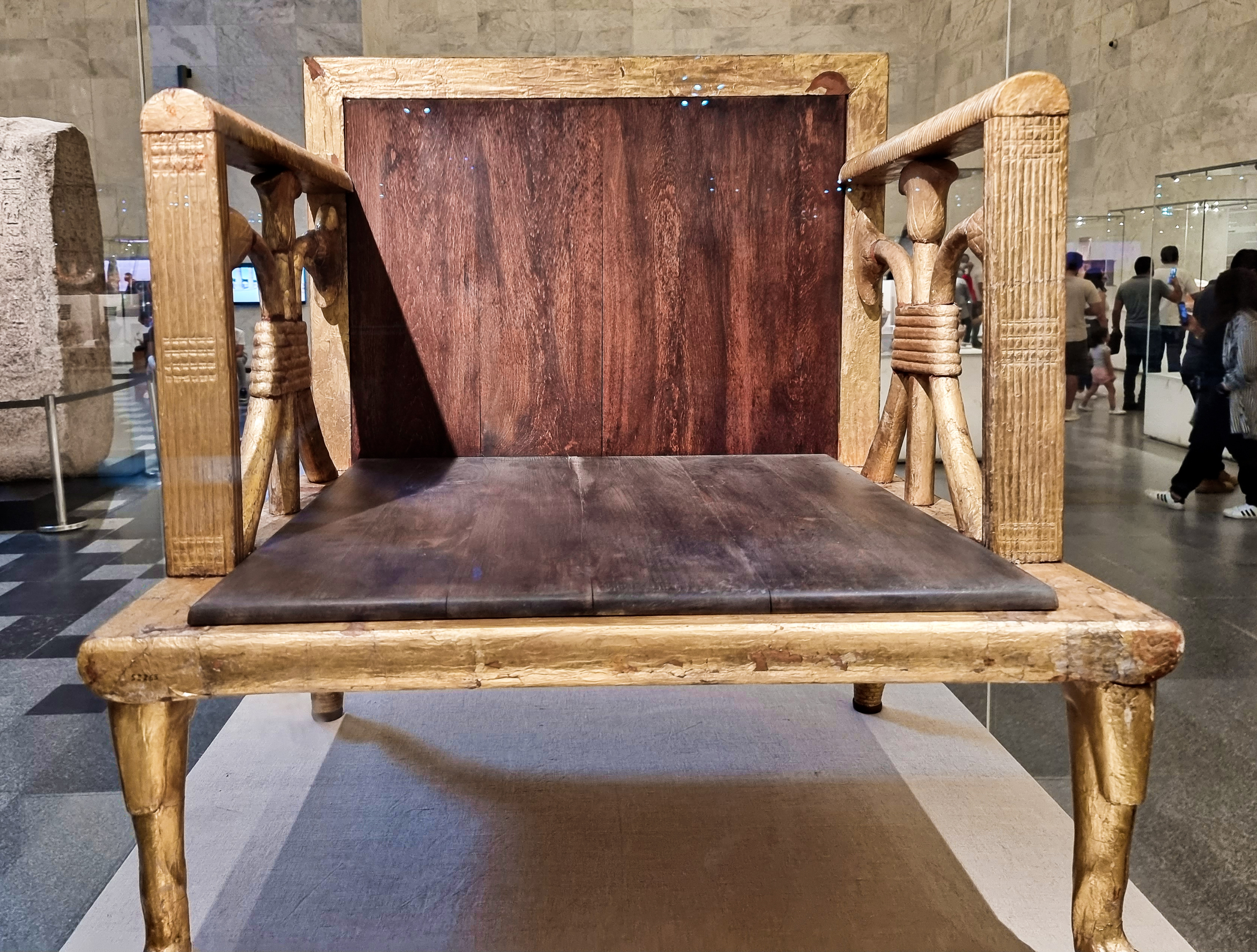
Chair of Queen Hetepheres I, Khufu's mother

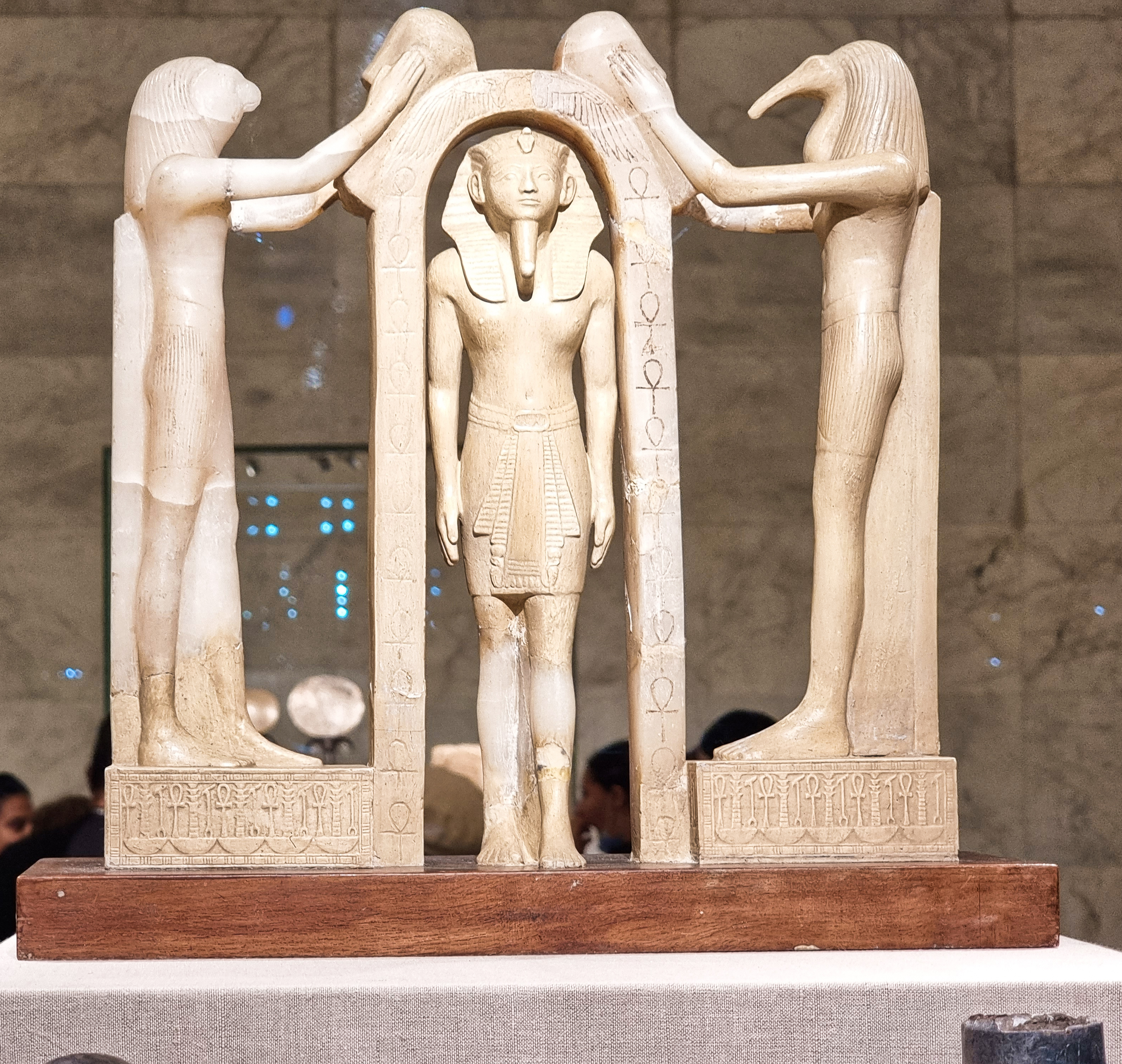
Statue of the gods Horus (left) and Thoth (right) purifying Amenhotep II

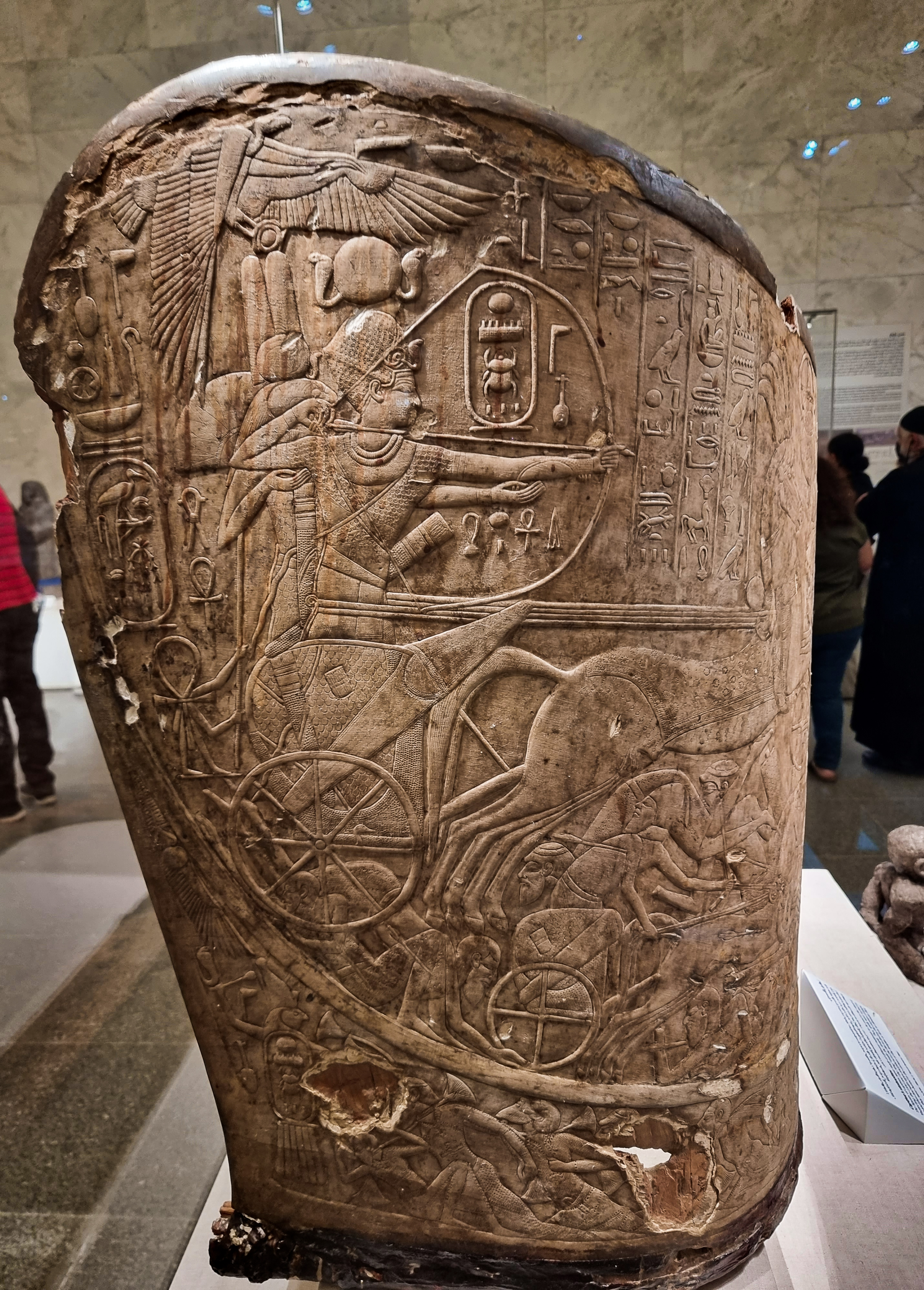
Chariot of king Thutmose IV

== Accessibility and tickets ==
The museum provides easy access to suit all visitors such as free wheelchairs, designated parking spots, and elevators. Brochures in Braille are available on request; reservations in advance are required for sign-language tours.

The ticket prices for foreigners: 550 EGP (11$) for Adults, 300 EGP (6$) for Students.

== Notable donations ==
In late 2017, Zahi Hawass reported that Francis Ricciardone, the president of the American University in Cairo, donated 5,000 of its artifacts to the National Museum of Egyptian Civilization.

== Usage ==
The museum hosted the final draw of the 2021 World Men's Handball Championship. The museum also has a Conservation Center and storage.

== See also ==
- List of museums of Egyptian antiquities
