= Gabriela Ramos =

Mexican economist and diplomat

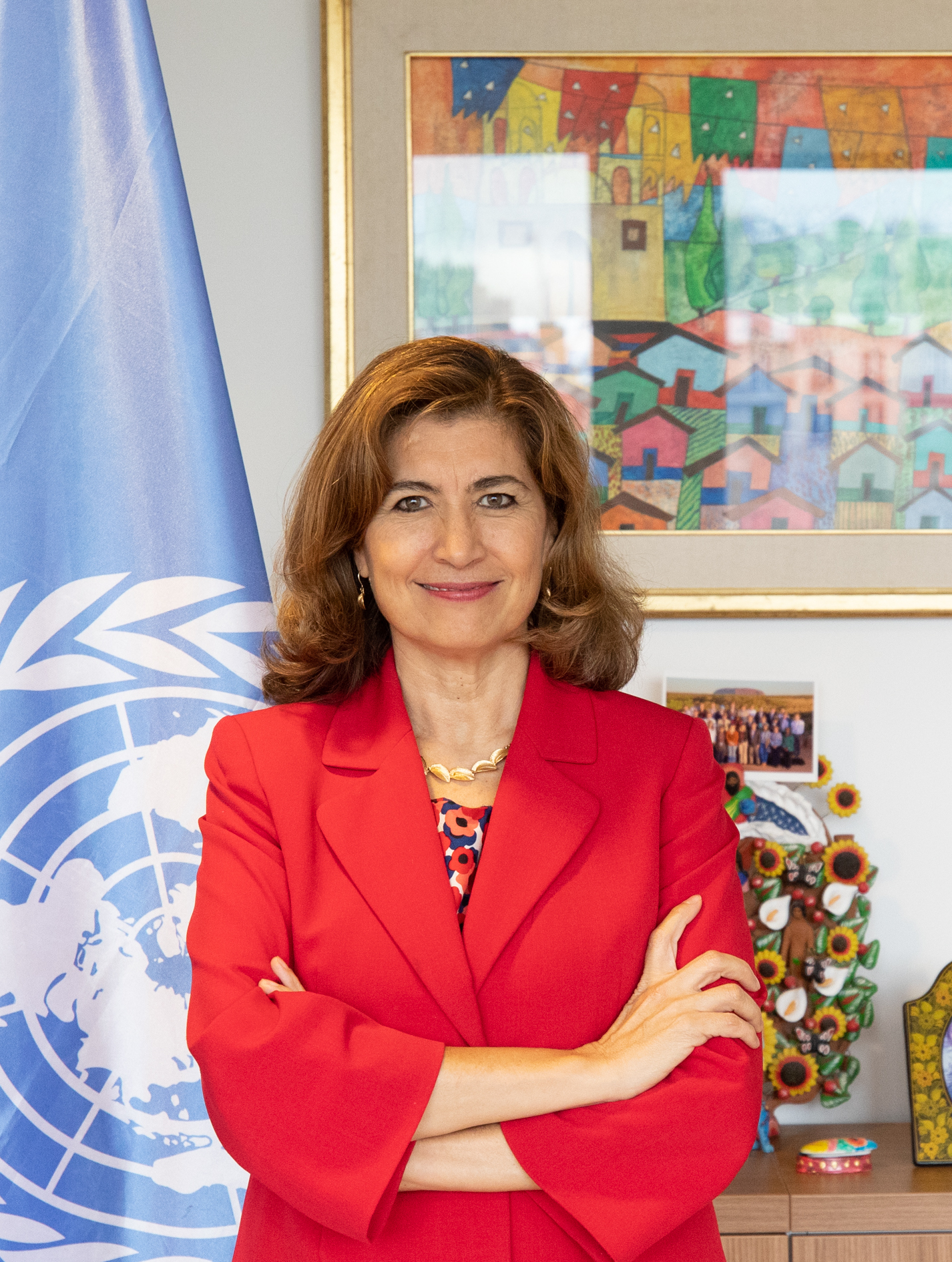
Gabriela Ramos, Assistant Director-General for the Social and Human Sciences of UNESCO

Gabriela Ramos (born April 8, 1964) is a Mexican economist, diplomat and international civil servant. In 2020 she was appointed Assistant Director-General for Social and Human Sciences at UNESCO.

In March 2025 the Government of Mexico presented her candidacy for the position of UNESCO Director-General for the period 2026-2029. Ramos withdrew from the race amidst controversy around harassment and misconduct claims.

== Biography ==
Ramos graduated with a bachelor's degree in international relations from the Universidad Iberoamericana and received a master's degree in public policy at the Harvard Kennedy School. She is married to Ricardo López, with whom she has two daughters, Paula and Julia.

=== Career ===
Ramos held various positions in the Mexican government, first as part of the Foreign Service and as advisor to the Minister of Foreign Affairs and to the Minister of Budget and later as the Director of Economic Affairs and the OECD in the Ministry of Foreign Affairs between 1995 and 1998. Between 1998 and 2000, she was a founding partner of Portico, a public policy consultancy.

From 2000 to 2006, she worked as director of the OECD's México Centre covering Mexico and Latin America.

In 2008, Ramos was appointed Cabinet Director of the Secretary-General of the OECD, José Ángel Gurría. In 2008, she was also appointed as the OECD's Sherpa for the G20, G7, and APEC. At the OECD, she also led the organization's "Inclusive Growth" initiative and the "New Approaches for Economic Growth" (NAEC) initiative.

In 2020, UNESCO Director-General Audrey Azoulay appointed Ramos as Assistant Director-General for Social and Human Sciences.

== Recognition and awards ==
In 2013, she was awarded the Order of Merit in the Chevalier degree by the French President, François Hollande.

She received the 2017 Forbes Awards for Excellence in Management. Apolitical listed her among the 100 most significant figures in gender politics.
