= Mamdouh Eldamaty =

Egyptian Egyptologist

Mamdouh Mohamed Gad Eldamaty (Arabic: ممدوح محمد جاد الدماطي; born 6 December 1961) is an Egyptian Egyptologist who has served in the government of Egypt as Minister of Antiquities from 2014 until 2016. He has also worked as Professor of Egyptology at the Department of Archaeology, Faculty of Arts, Ain Shams University in Cairo. On 15 May 2011, he became Cultural Counselor and Head of the Educational Mission at the Embassy of Egypt in Berlin. On 16 June 2014, it was announced that he was to be appointed as Minister of Antiquities, a position he held until March 2016 when he was replaced by Khaled al-Anani after a cabinet reshuffle.

== Early life and education ==
He was born in Cairo and attended high school there. In 1979, he registered with the Faculty of Archaeology, Cairo University. In July 1981, he was looking for a summer job as a student. He went to the Egyptian Museum in Cairo and met with Mohamed Saleh, the vice director of the museum. He worked there for one month. In the summer of 1982, he worked at the museum again during a summer student job. He did work that brought him into contact with all departments of the museum. In 1983, he graduated from the Faculty of Archaeology, Cairo University.

After his graduation, he did voluntary work at the museum for a month. After that, he joined the restoration team of the Coptic Museum for several months. In January 1984, he started his 15-month-long conscription service. He worked at the museum again from April 1985 to September 1987. He rejoined the Faculty at Cairo University to resume higher studies. The thesis of his Master's Degree was "St-Meskhnet hall at Dendera Temple, linguistic and cultural study" under the supervision of Abdelhalim Noureldin and partnership of Ola El-Aguizy.

Through his work at the Museum he became acquainted with many Egyptologists and archaeologists who visited the Museum. Among those was Erich Winter at Trier University, who along with his wife visited Egypt in 1987 and were accompanied by the young Mamdouh Eldamaty during their 3-day visit to Siwa Oasis. This new contact proved to be quite useful as Winter encouraged the young Egyptologist to continue his studies under his supervision at the Department of Egyptology at Trier University.

In October 1988 he worked as a curator at the Faculty of Archaeology Museum of Cairo University. During his work he got his master's degree in April 1989 in Egyptology from the same faculty. Immediately he left Egypt for Germany on leave to prepare for his PhD. Without any state-sponsored scholarships, it was rather difficult for him to get an entry visa to study in Germany without a guarantor. Thanks to the help and support of his Professor and guarantor, Mohamed Saleh, an entry visa was issued and he started his German-language courses at Cologne University as soon as he arrived in Germany. He supported himself by working during summer vacation. While in Cologne he had correspondence with Trier University. He was accepted to Trier University, which he joined in the winter semester of 1989/1990. He commenced his Trier residence by learning German until he acquired the Deutsche Sprachprüfung für den Hochschulzugang which qualified him for regular study at the university. He registered for Egyptology as his major subject with classical archaeology and ethnology as minor subjects in the summer semester of 1991.

During the winter semester of 1992/93, he registered for his PhD with the thesis 'Sokar-Osiris-Kapelle im Tempel von Dendera' for which he received a study scholarship from the Ministry of Culture at Rhineland-Palatinate that enabled him to conclude his studies in June 1995. During his stay in Germany, on 26 February 1992 he married Aida Abdelghany Ahmed, who studied sociology at Zagazig University. She accompanied him to Germany where she gave birth to their first daughter, Mariam, in Trier in 1993.

Having concluded his PhD, he returned to Egypt in September 1995 but kept visiting Trier frequently in the years 1996, 1997, 1999, 2002, 2004 and 2007 in order to follow recent publications and studies on Egyptology. Back in Cairo, where the family got a son and another daughter, he resumed his work for the Faculty's Museum until January 1996.

Starting from January 1996, he became a lecturer for Egyptology at the Faculty of Tourism and Hotels, Cairo University, Fayoum Branch. Upon founding an archaeological department at the Faculty of Arts, Ain Shams University in August 1998, he moved to the new department as a lecturer for Egyptology until end of 2001.

== Career ==
=== Director General of Egyptian Museum in Cairo ===
At the beginning of 2001 he was appointed Director General of the Egyptian Museum in Cairo, a post that he held until the end of January 2004.

During his directorship, the Museum witnessed several far reaching activities, developing its cellar (April 2001), restoring old records of the Museum (May 2001), preparing for the second chamber for royal mummies (June 2001) and establishing a restoration laboratory for papyrus, in cooperation with Corrado Basile, Director of Istituto Internazionale del Papiro, Syracuse in Italy (March 2003).

In July 2001 he presented a concept for the centennial of the Egyptian Museum in Cairo, which included several projects to promote and develop the old institution. This concept was approved by Gaballa Ali Gaballa, the Secretary General of the Higher Council for Monuments, and by the Minister of Culture as well. These activities were performed in late 2002 in the time of the successor of Gaballa, Zahi Hawass, who gave this ceremony special attention.

Eldamaty was assigned also to supervise the external exhibitions committee from May 2002 to February 2004.

=== Professor at Ain Shams University ===
Having concluded his assignment at the Egyptian Museum he returned to his main work in teaching at Ain Shams University. There he got the post of associate professor of Egyptology at the Faculty of Arts from 25 March 2001 until 20 August 2006. On 21 August he became a full professor of Egyptology and presided over the Department of Archaeology, Faculty of Arts at Ain Shams University from 12 September 2006 until 12 September 2009.

At the same time, he was assigned to head the college center for studies, consultations, and training from 15 October 2008 until 13 October 2009 when he took over the post of director of the Open Education Center from 22 March 2009 until 15 November 2009. Starting from 13 September 2009 until 14 May 2011, he was the Dean of the Faculty of Arts at Ain Shams University. During his deanship he supervised the Project for Sustainable Development and Qualifying for Accreditation. This sustainable development specified certain criteria for the selection of university cadres, which was approved by the college council, albeit not by the university council due to the political conditions accompanying the Arab spring in January 2011.

Following the revolution, he organized the first election process in Egyptian universities to choose his successor as Dean of the Faculty in March 2011, as he left the country on 15 May 2011 in the capacity of cultural counselor at the Egyptian Embassy to Berlin and head of the educational mission there. In this post, he supervised all Egyptian students in Germany, the Netherlands, Poland, Denmark, Sweden, Finland and Norway.

==== Teaching in international universities and schools ====
- SS.1993 and WS. 1993/94, teaching "Pharaonic art" in the "Volkshochschule' in Trier (Germany).
- WS 2006 – WS 2007, teaching "Late Period Monuments"; "History of Ancient Egypt Art" and "History of Ancient Egypt" in the American University in Cairo (AUC).
- 1 April 2005 – 31 July 2005 Guest Professor in the Seminar of Egyptology, Basel University in Switzerland.

=== Teaching in Egyptian universities ===
- Oct 1995 - May 1997, teaching "Ancient Egyptian Art and Egyptian Art in the Ptolemaic Period" in the Faculty of Archaeology, Cairo University.
- Oct 1995 - May 1998, teaching "Ancient Egyptian Language and Egyptian Art in the Ptolemaic Period" in the Faculty of Archaeology, Cairo University, Fayoum Branch.
- Oct 1996 - May 1999, teaching "Ancient Egyptian Art" in the High Institute of Tourism and Hotels.
- Oct 1996 – May 2004, teaching "Egyptian art in the Ptolemaic Period" in the Faculty of Tourism and Hotels, Helwan University.
- Oct 2005 to date, teaching "Ancient Egyptian History" in the Faculty of Pharmacy, Misr International University.
- Oct 2005 to date, teaching "Ancient Egyptian Language" in the Faculty of Arabic Language, Al-Azhar University.

== Membership and other professional activities ==
- International Committee of Arabic Museums (ICOM-Arab). Vice President of

ICOM-Arab (Sep 2001 – Oct 2003).

- President of ICOM-Arab (Oct 2003 - 2004).
- International Association of Egyptologists.
- Arab Archaeologists Association.
- Egyptian Society for historical studies.
- The German Archaeological Institute (DAI).
- The team in charge of the establishment of the Egypt Archaeological Map.
- Board of Directors of the antiquities Museum of the library of Alexandria

(Bibliotheca Alexandrina).

- Egyptological team in charge of the organization of the exhibits of the New

Museum of Egyptian antiquities to be built in Giza (from Sep 1999 to 31 Jan 2004).

- Board of Directors of Cairo Museum (from 1 Feb 2001 to 31 Jan 2004).
- Board of Directors of permanent committee in SCA. (From 01 Feb 2001 to

31 Jan 2004).

- Board of Directors of Museums sector in SCA. (From 1 Feb 2001 to 31 Jan 2004).

Awards and honors

Legion of Honor "Cavalier" from the Italian Government (10 Oct 2004).

State Award for Excellence in Social Sciences (21 Jun 2010)

== Scientific publications ==
- “Squatting statues in the Cairo Museum”, in: Mitteilungen des Deutschen Archäologischen Instituts Abteilung Kairo 46, Mainz 1990, 1-13 (Taf. 1-9).
- “Isis-Hathor im Tempel von Dendera”, in: Aegyptiaca Treverensia 7 (Festschrift für Erich Winter), Mainz 1994, 81-87.
- Sokar-Osiris-Kapelle im Tempel von Dendera, Hamburg 1995.
- “Eine Szene der Besänftigung der Sachmet im Kiosk von Dendera”, in: Journal of the faculty of Archaeology 7, Cairo 1996, 147-156.
- “Der Goldfalke als Opfergabe in den grichisch-römischen Tempel”, in: Göttinger Miszellen 161, Göttingen 1997, 51-64.
- “Horus als Ka des Königs”, in: Göttinger Miszellen 169, Göttingen 1999, 31-45 (Taf. 1-8).
- Catalogue Général of Egyptian Antiquities in the Cairo Museum, Statues of the XXVth. and XXVIth. Dynasties, Nr. 48601-48649, Cairo 1999. (together with Jack A. Josephson)
- “Die Schutzformeln hinter dem König im Kiosk des Tempels von Dendera”, in: Bibliothèque d’Etude 138 (Hommages a Fayza Haikal), Cairo 2003, 83-91.
- “Die Treppe des Hinaufsteigens zum Dach des Tempels von Dendera im Neujahrfest”, in: Egyptology at the dawn of the twenty-first century (proceedings of the Eighth International Congress of Egyptologists, Cairo 2000), vol. 1, Cairo 2003, 171-179.
- “The Egyptian Directors of the Cairo Museum 1941-1991”, in: Bulletin of the Egyptian Museum 1, Cairo 2004, 7-8. (together with Heba Samy)
- Ein ptolemäisches Pristerdekret aus dem Jahr 186 v. Chr. eine neue Version von Philensis II in Kairo, APF-Beiheft 20, München und Leipzig 2005.
- “Zur Bedeutung der leeren Kartuschen”, in: Göttinger Miszellen 207 (2005), pp. 23–36.
- “Stela of Iuyres in Cairo Museum”, in: Journal of the faculty of Archaeology 10, Cairo 2005, pp 63–69.
- “Zwei Stelen mit Sonnenhymnen aus dem Kairener Museum”, (FS Mohamed Saleh), in: Bulletin of the Egyptian Museum 2, Cairo 2005, pp. 55–60.
- “Die leeren Kartuschen aus der Regierungszeit von Kleopatra VII. im Tempel von Dendera”, in: OLA 150 (Leuven, 2007), pp. 511– 544.
- “A Statuette of Psamtik I with a Spear”, in: Sue H. D’Auria, Servant of Mut: Studies in Honor of Richard A. Fazzini, Leiden 2007, pp. 83–88.
- “Die leeren Kartuschen im Tempel von Edfu”, in: U. Rössler & T. Tawfik (HRSG.), Die ihr vorbeigehen werdet ... Wenn Gräber, Tempel und Statuen sprechen, Gedenkschrift für Prof. Sayed Tawfik Ahmed, SDAIK 16, Berlin 2009, pp. 81–102, Taf. 9-12.
- "Die leeren Kartuschen von Echnaton”, in: Sue H. D'Auria (edit.), Offerings of the Discerning Eye, An Egyptological Medley in Honor of Jack Josephson, (= Culture and Hisrtory of the Ancient Near East 38, Leiden 2010), pp. 79–81.
- “Die ptolemäische Königin als Weiblicher Horus”, in: A. Jördens und J. F. Quack (edit.), Ägypten zwischen innerem Zwist und äußerem Druck. Die Zeit Ptolemaios’ VI. bis VIII., (= PHILIPPIKA, Marburger altertumskundliche Abhandlungen 45, Wiesbaden 2011), pp. 24–57.
- التاريخ المصري القديم من البداية إلى نهاية الدولة الوسطى (بالإشتراك مع زكية طبوزادة)، القاهرة 2000.
- أثار مصر القديمة من أقدم العصور حتى نهاية الدولة الوسطى (بالإشتراك مع سعيد عبد الحفيظ)، القاهرة 2000.
- وثائق المتحف المصري، القاهرة 2002.
- "لوحتين لتقدمة السخت بالمتحف المصري"، في: مقتنيات أثار مصرية في متاحف حول العالم، دراسات بمناسبة الإحتفال بالذكرى المئوية للمتحف المصري بالقاهرة، القاهرة 2002، المجلد الثاني، 67-75.
- أطلس المواقع الأثرية بمحافظات الوجه البحري (بالإشتراك مع فايزة هيكل، وبسمة قورة، وجيهان زكي)، الأجزاء 1-4، القاهرة 2001-2002.
- "متحف المكفوفين"، في: مجلة المتحف المصري، العدد الأول، القاهرة 2004، 1-6.
- نشأة المتحف المصري وتطوره من 1902-2002م، في: بريزم، عدد 10 (2003)، 48-51.
- مدخل إلى علم الأثار ، القاهرة 2007، الطبعة الثانية 2010.
- المتاحف المصرية، سلسلة موسوعة الثقافة التاريخية والأثرية والحضارية، التاريخ القديم 13، القاهرة 2007.
- آثار ما قبل التاريخ، القاهرة 2008.
- منهج البحث في الأثار المصرية، القاهرة 2009.

== Articles in catalogs of special exhibitions ==
- Cat. No. 78, 79 & 105, in: The Quest for Immortality, Treasures of Ancient Egypt, Washington 2002 (in USA).
- The Third Intermediate Period (together with Isabelle Franco), in: The Pharaohs, Milano 2002, 69-83 (in Italy).
- Prosopa tis Aigyptou apo tin Giza sto Fagioum (together with Mohamed Saleh), Athens 2003 (in Greece).
- Cat. Nr. 42-46, in: Tutanchamun, das goldene Jenseits, Basel 2004 (in Switzerland).
- Das Ägyptische Museum in Kairo, in: Tutanchamun, das goldene Jenseits, Basel 2004, 17-26 (in Switzerland).

Editor of

- Egyptian Museum collections around the World, Studies for the Centennial of the Egyptian Museum, Cairo 2002 (together with Mai Trad).
- Bulletin of the Egyptian Museum, Vols. 1-2, Cairo 2004-2005 (together with Zahi Hawass and Khaled Daoud).
