= Sherif Fathy =

Egyptian politician

- شريف فتحي

Minister of Tourism and Antiquities
- Incumbent
- Assumed office 3 July 2024
- President: Abdel Fattah el-Sisi
- Prime Minister: Mostafa Madbouly
- Preceded by: Ahmad Issa

Sherif Fathy (Arabic: شريف فتحي) is the current Egyptian Minister of Tourism and Antiquities, appointed on 3 July 2024, in Mostafa Madbouly's second cabinet. He previously served as Egypt's Minister of Civil Aviation and was Chairman of the Board of Directors of EgyptAir Holding Company.
