= André Azoulay =

Moroccan politician (born 1941)

- أندري أزولاي ⴰⵏⴷⵔⵉ ⴰⵣⵓⵍⴰⵢ
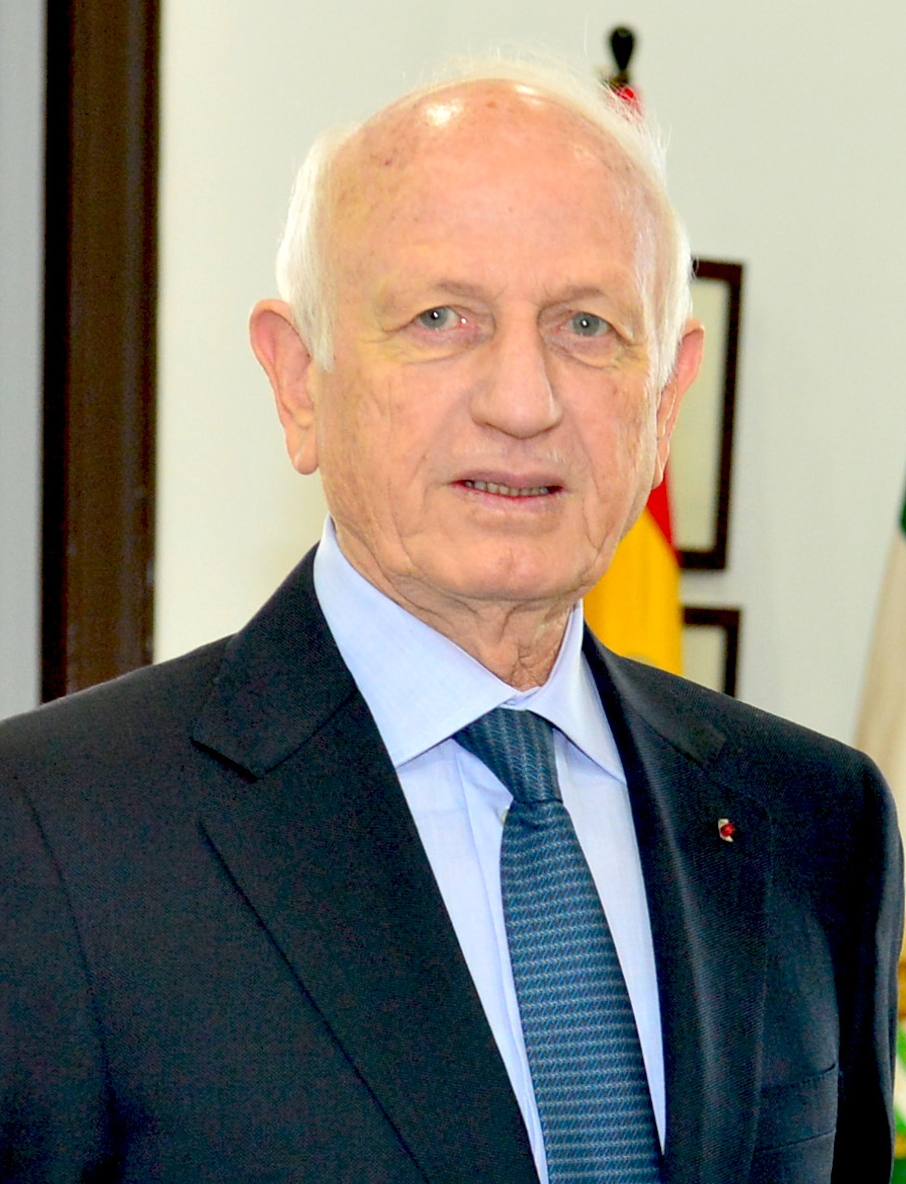
- Azoulay in 2014

Senior Advisor to the King of Morocco
- Incumbent
- Assumed office 1991
- Monarchs: Hassan II; Mohammed VI

President of the Euro-Mediterranean Anna Lindh Foundation
- Incumbent
- Assumed office 2008

Executive Vice-President of Paribas
- In office 1986–1990

Personal details
- Born: 17 April 1941 (age 85) Essaouira, Morocco
- Spouse: Katia Azoulay
- Children: Audrey Azoulay
- Education: Centre de formation des journalistes

André Azoulay (Arabic: أندري أزولاي; Berber languages: ⴰⵏⴷⵔⵉ ⴰⵣⵓⵍⴰⵢ; Hebrew: אנדרה אזולאי; born 17 April 1941) is a Moroccan politician, activist and diplomat. He is a senior adviser to King Mohammed VI and previously advised his father, King Hassan II. He currently presides over the Anna Lindh Euro-Mediterranean Foundation for the Dialogue Between Cultures, based in Alexandria, Egypt. Azoulay is the President of the executive committee of the Foundation for the Three Cultures and the Three Religions, based in Seville, Spain.

He is a founding member of the C-100 Davos Forum for the Dialogue of Civilisations and religions, and was formerly Executive Vice-president of the BNP Paribas, Paris. Azoulay's daughter is UNESCO Director-General Audrey Azoulay. Hailing from the Moroccan Jewish community, he is referred to as one of the most powerful Jews of the Muslim world.

== Early life ==
Born in Essaouira, in 1941 to a Moroccan Sephardic Jewish family, Azoulay was educated in Paris where he studied economics, journalism, and international relations. Previously to his current position as Counsellor to the King of Morocco, Azoulay had a long career within the Paribas Bank in Paris (1968 to 1990) where, as Executive Vice-president, he covered the Middle East and North Africa Region as well as heading the bank's public affairs department.

As a counselor to the Moroccan monarchy since 1991, Azoulay has largely contributed to the implementation of economic reforms that have been applied throughout the kingdom since their inception in the early 1990s. He also played a significant role in the privatization and deregulation programs which began in 1993. Azoulay emphasized the need for sustaining the role of the private sector and encouraging international investment to sustain economic growth in Morocco. Azoulay has also largely contributed to promoting Morocco throughout the world.

== Career ==
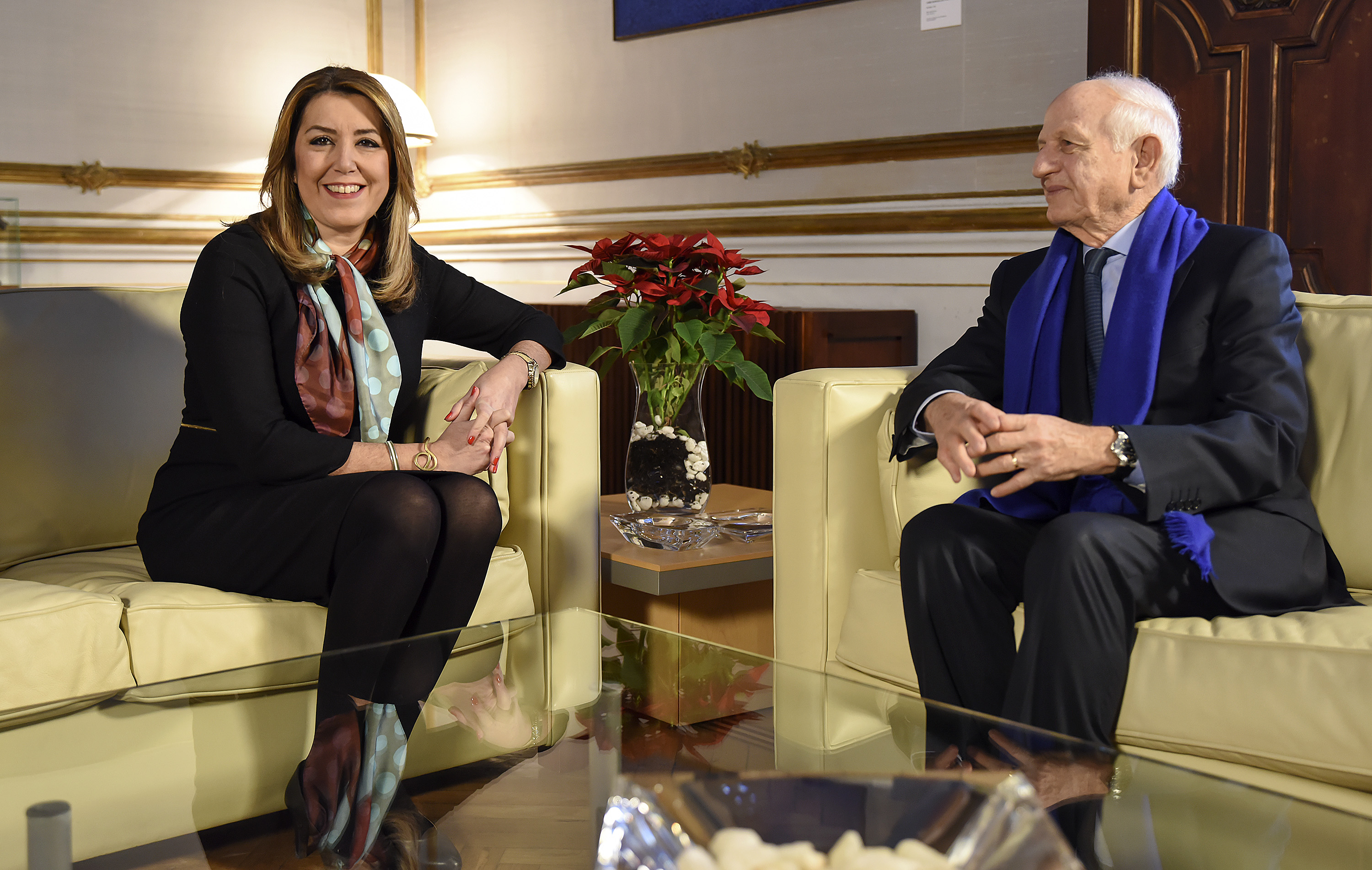
Susana Díaz with Azoulay

Azoulay is also known for his historical input in the follow-up of the peace process in the Middle East and the many initiatives he has been involved in the perspective of deepening the logic of reconciliation between Jews and Muslims. In addition to his professional responsibilities André Azoulay has always fought for peace and dialogue between the Arab Muslim World and that of the Jewish communities in Europe, the United States, Morocco as well as the Arab, Berber and Jewish diasporas worldwide.

For over 40 years, Azoulay has taken an active part in supporting the activities of different movements and associations whose vocation is the two-state solution (Palestine and Israel) and to help the process of better understanding and mutual respect between Islam and the Western World.

As president of the executive committee of the Foundation of the Three Cultures and the Three Religions, based in Seville (Spain), Azoulay is one of the founders of the Aladin Group (Paris) created to promote mutual knowledge and intercultural relations among Muslims and Jews. In August 2005, Azoulay was also nominated member of the "High-Level Group" for the "Alliance of Civilizations, set up by the United Nations. Instigated by Spain and co-sponsored by Turkey, this initiative is addressing the issue of the relations between Islam and the Western world.

In this context, Azoulay was elected on 5 March 2008 and reelected on 9 September 2011 as President of the Euro-Mediterranean Anna Lindh Foundation, and a member of the Executive Committee of the Mediterranean Council for Culture (Paris). He is also a board member of the Mediterranean Study and Research Centre (Marseille), the Yala online leadership Academy, and the Institut de Prospective et d’Etudes pour le Monde Méditerranéen (Paris).

A member of the Board of Al Akhawayne University (Ifrane), the Mediterranean University (Fès), and the High Council of the Alliance Israelite Universelle, Azoulay belongs to the Scientific Committee of "Medinas" a think-tank created by the World Bank and the European Investment Bank to protect, restore and promote the "Medinas" in the Arab World. He is also a member of the boards of the Institute Pierre Mendès-France (Paris) and YALA (Young Araba Leaders for Peace).

Belonging to the boards of several economic and financial institutions, Azoulay is a member of the Royal Academy of Morocco and of the Royal Academy of Spain for Economic and Financial Sciences. He has been honored with the title of "Commandeur dans l’Ordre du Trône" (Morocco) and he has received many awards and titles of honor throughout the world (France, Spain, Italy, Germany, UK, Portugal, Brazil, Mexico, Argentina). Azoulay received the Lifetime Achievement Award from the American Sephardi Federation in New York, where Enrico Macias and David Serero performed during the ceremony in his honor.

In 2023, Azoulay was awarded the Israeli Presidential Medal of Honor, the country's highest civil medal, by President Isaac Herzog for making a "unique contribution to the Jewish people".

=== Essaouira ===
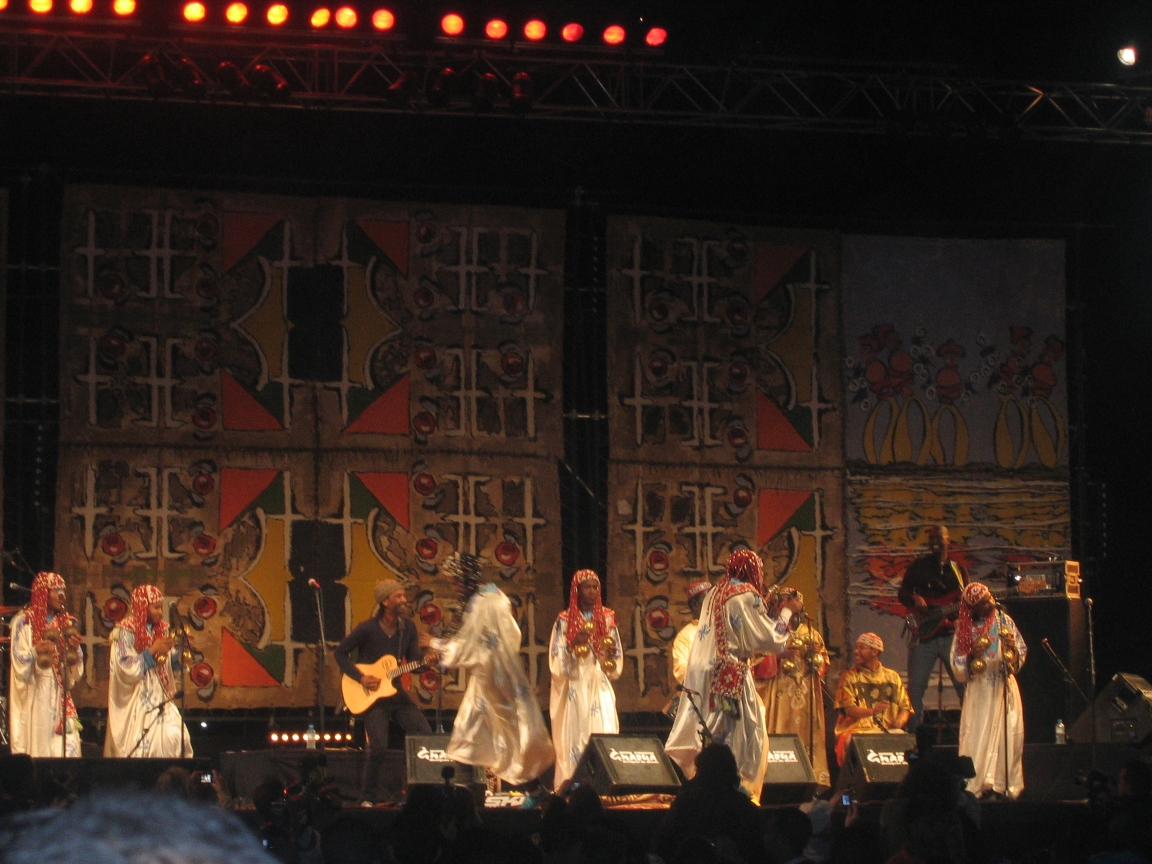
Gnaoua (Gnawa) musicians performing during the 2010 Gnaoua World Music Festival in the city of Essaouira, Morocco

Alongside his wife Katia, also born in Essaouira, who published 2 books "Essaouira-Mogador : Parfums d’Enfance" and "Essaouira-Mogador : Passion partagée", Azoulay is the architect of the promotion and revival of the city. He is the founder and president of the Association Essaouira-Mogador, which was established in 1992 as an original approach to the sustainable development of the city based on its cultural diversity and spiritual legacy.

== Honours ==
- France: Commander of the Legion of Honour
- Israel: Israeli Presidential Medal of Honour
- Morocco: Commander of the Order of the Throne
- Peru: Grand Cross of the Order of the Sun of Peru
- Portugal: Grand Cross of the Order of Merit (Portugal)
- Portugal: Grand Officer of the Order of Prince Henry
- Spain: Grand Cross of the Civil Order of Alfonso X, the Wise
- Spain: Grand Cross of the Order of Civil Merit

== See also ==
- Foreign relations of Morocco
- Moroccan Jews
- Audrey Azoulay
- Kings of Morocco
