= Ahmed Issa (politician) =

Egyptian economist and politician

Minister of Tourism and Antiquities
- Incumbent
- Assumed office 13 August 2022
- President: Abdel Fattah el-Sisi
- Prime Minister: Mostafa Madbouly
- Preceded by: Khaled al-Anani
- Succeeded by: Sherif Fathy

Ahmed Issa is an Egyptian, economist, banker and former minister of Tourism and Antiquities. His appointment as tourism minister from his position as chief executive officer of Retail Banking at Commercial International Bank (CIB), Egypt is to reform tourism sector's economic and commercial viability.

== Career ==
Ahmed Issa began his banking career in 1993 at CIB and worked within the Investment Banking and Corporate Banking units of the bank until 2001 when he took a two-year study leave for his MBA at UNC Kenan–Flagler Business School. After his return from the study leave, he was promoted to the position of managing director of capital investment banking, head of research, strategic planning and group CFO at CIB. He was chairman of board of directors of Falcon Group and chairman of board of directors of Corplease, a prominent lease finance company in Egypt. He was a non-executive board director Egypt Air Holding, American Chamber of Commerce and a member of MasterCard MENA Leadership Council.

He was the CEO of retail banking unit of CIB before being appointed minister of Tourism and Antiquities in August 2022 to reform the sector. He replaced Khaled El-Anani.
