= Fayza Haikal =

Egyptologist

- Born: April 11, 1938
- Title: Professor

Academic background
- Education: Cairo University, Oxford University
- Thesis: Two hieratic funerary papyri of Nesmin (1965)

Academic work
- Discipline: Egyptology
- Institutions: American University in Cairo

Fayza Mohamed Hussein Haikal (born 1938) is a professor emerita of Egyptology at the American University in Cairo and the first Egyptian woman to earn a PhD in Egyptology.

== Education and career ==
Haikal was born on April 11, 1938; her father was a prominent Egyptian politician. She attended the Lycée Français du Caire as a child, and studied Egyptology at the Faculty of Arts at Cairo University from 1956 to 1960, where she received her BA. After graduating, she successfully applied for a scholarship to study Egyptology abroad; in the following year, before taking up the scholarship, she worked on the UNESCO Campaign in Nubia to save monuments at risk from the construction of the Aswan Dam, first being responsible for revising the campaign's epigraphic material for publication, and then conducting fieldwork in Nubia. Egyptian women had not previously been allowed to travel to work archaeological excavations, and Haikal describes herself as having 'paved the way for women Egyptologists to work in Nubia". From 1961 to 1965, Haikal studied in the UK, initially at University College London, where her supervisor, W.B. Emery, on being asked to include her in his team working in Nubia, replied "I don't take girls in my team". She transferred to St Anne's College, Oxford University, in 1962, where she studied for a D.Phil. on Egyptian papyri at the British Museum. She gained her doctorate in 1965, becoming the first Egyptian woman to earn a Ph.D. in Egyptology.

After graduating, Haikal returned to Cairo to teach Egyptology, but subsequently moved to various countries due to her husband's job as a diplomat (she had married Mohamed Abdel Halim Mahmoud just before graduating with her D.Phil.; he died in 1979); during his posting to Italy she taught at La Sapienza University of Rome. In the 1980s she became Professor of Egyptology at the American University in Cairo. Her archaeological work in this position included directing a project to protect archeological sites during the construction of the Peace Canal in northern Sinai. In 1988, she was elected as the first Egyptian and the first woman President of the International Association of Egyptologists. Haikal has also been a visiting professor at La Sapienza in Rome and the Sorbonne (both 1994) and Charles University in Prague (2000), and in 2006-2007 was the Blaise Pascal Chair of Research at the Sorbonne.

== Honours ==
A Festschrift titled "Hommages à Fayza Haikal" was published by the Institut Français d'Archéologie Orientale in 2003, and Haikal was nominated for ‘Woman of the Year’ in 2015 by the Egypt Exploration Society and the Egyptian Ministry of Antiquities. She was given the Honorary Membership of the International Association of Egyptologists in 2019.
