= Audrey Azoulay =

French civil servant and politician (born 1972)

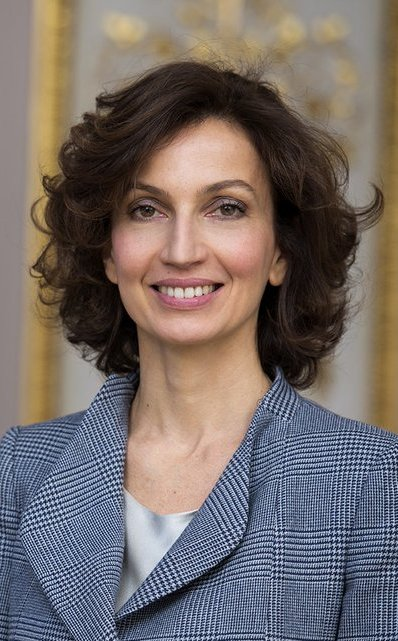
- Azoulay in 2016

10th Director-General of the United Nations Educational, Scientific and Cultural Organization
- In office 15 November 2017 – 15 November 2025
- Deputy Director-General: Xing Qu
- Preceded by: Irina Bokova
- Succeeded by: Khaled El-Enany

Minister of Culture
- In office 11 February 2016 – 10 May 2017
- Prime Minister: Manuel Valls; Bernard Cazeneuve
- Preceded by: Fleur Pellerin
- Succeeded by: Françoise Nyssen

Personal details
- Born: 4 August 1972 (age 54) La Celle-Saint-Cloud, France
- Party: Independent
- Parent: André Azoulay (father)
- Education: Paris Dauphine University; Lancaster University; Sciences Po; École nationale d'administration

Audrey Azoulay (French: [odʁɛ azulɛ]; born 4 August 1972) is a French civil servant and politician who has served as the 10th Director-General of the United Nations Educational, Scientific and Cultural Organization (UNESCO) from 2017 to 2025, becoming the second female leader of the organization. She previously served as France's Minister of Culture under prime ministers Manuel Valls and Bernard Cazeneuve from 2016 to 2017. In 2024 she won the award of Paris Dauphine University Alumna of the Year.

== Early life and education ==
Audrey Azoulay was born on 4 August 1972 in La Celle-Saint-Cloud to a Moroccan Jewish family from Essaouira. Her father, André Azoulay, served as a senior adviser to Moroccan kings Hassan II and Mohammed VI.

Azoulay gained a master's degree in management science from Paris Dauphine University in 1994 and an MBA from Lancaster University. She also studied at Sciences Po and the École nationale d'administration (ENA) in 2000 (promotion Averroès, alongside Fleur Pellerin, Alexis Kohler and Nicolas Kazadi among others).

=== Activism and political orientation ===
During her university studies, Azoulay worked at a bank, which she says she "hated". During her studies in the École Nationale d'Administration, she says she "discovered the old French anti-Semitism". She recalled having participated in demonstrations against the Devaquet bill in 1986 and against the Juppé plan in 1995, and against the candidature of Jean-Marie Le Pen in the second round of the 2002 French presidential election. Her role models are Simone Veil and Jean Zay.

== Career ==
=== Public sector ===
In 2000, Azoulay was appointed civil administrator, assigned to the general secretariat of Prime Minister Lionel Jospin's government. From April 2000 to July 2003, she worked as the head of the public audiovisual sector office, especially for the strategy and the funding of sector organizations in the media development department. At the same time, she manages media expertise missions for the European Commission within the process of pre-accession programs.

In 2003, Azoulay was in charge of the conference on media strategy, audiovisual and cinema financing at Sciences Po. From September 2003 to February 2006, she worked for the Ile-de-France Regional Chamber Accounts and with the committee for inquiry into the cost and performance of public service. In 2004, she appeared in the distribution of the film "Le Grand Rôle" by the director Steve Suissa, where she played the director's assistant.

In 2006, Azoulay joined the National Center of Cinematography and the moving image (CNC), successively holding the positions of Deputy Director for Multimedia Affairs, Chief Financial and Legal Officer and Deputy Director-General.

From 2014 until 2016, Azoulay served as an advisor on communications and cultural affairs to President François Hollande.

=== Minister of Culture of France ===
Azoulay succeeded Fleur Pellerin as Minister of Culture on 11 February 2016. During her time in office, she increased her department's budget by 6.6% to a total of €2.9 billion in 2017 – the largest amount of government money promised for the arts in the country's history. Under her leadership, the Ministry lent support to a women's contemporary art prize launched by AWARE (Archives of Women Artists, Research and Exhibitions). Internationally, she played a key role in the joint initiatives of France, the UNESCO and the United Arab Emirates to safeguard cultural heritage in conflict zones, announced in December 2016, and was a signatory to the Florence Declaration condemning the destruction of cultural sites at the first G7 culture summit in March 2017. On 24 March 2017, she presented Draft Resolution 2347 on the protection of cultural heritage in armed conflicts to the UN Security Council. This resolution, put forward by France, Italy and UNESCO, was adopted unanimously.

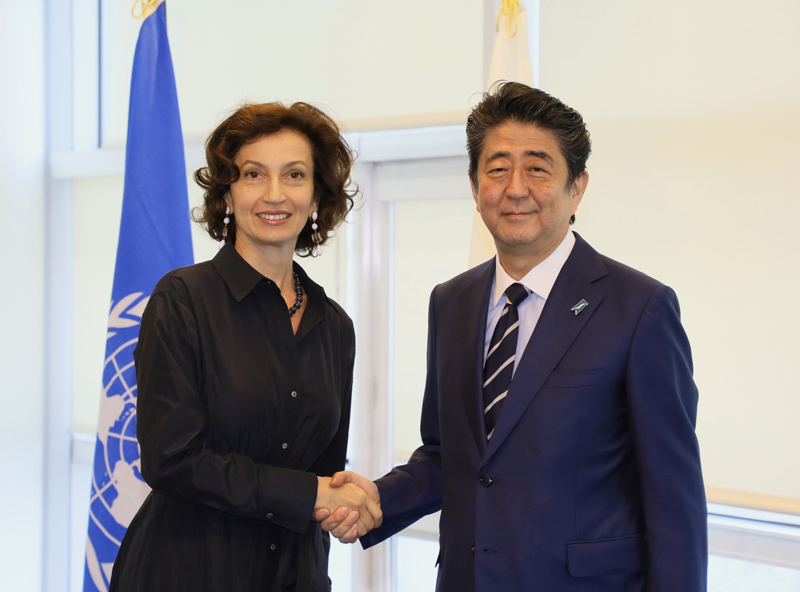
Azoulay with Japanese Prime Minister Shinzō Abe in 2018

By the end of 2016, Azoulay eventually decided against becoming a candidate herself in the 2017 French legislative election. In the Socialist Party's presidential primaries, she endorsed Manuel Valls as the party's candidate for the 2017 French presidential election. After the Socialist Party was eliminated in the first round of the election, she publicly declared her support for Emmanuel Macron against Marine Le Pen.

=== Director-General of UNESCO ===
In 2017, Azoulay was one of the nine candidates seeking to succeed Irina Bokova as Director-General of UNESCO. In the final round against Hamad Bin Abdulaziz Al-Kawari, she was elected as Director-General of UNESCO, and her candidacy was presented for approval at UNESCO's general assembly on 10 November 2017. In 2021, Azoulay was elected to a second four-year term.

==== Election ====
Although her chances were considered very slim when she declared her candidacy, she came second in the first round of voting, ahead of Egyptian candidate Moushira Khattab and behind Qatari candidate Hamad Bin Abdulaziz al-Kawari.

In the fourth round of balloting, the 58 members of the Executive Board nominated only one of the two finalists, Qatar's Hamad Bin Abdulaziz al-Kawari, who was first with 22 votes. Audrey Azoulay and Moushira Khattab tied for second place with 18 votes. In a new ballot, Audrey Azoulay was chosen as the second candidate, and the Egyptian Minister of Foreign Affairs called on voters to support her.

She was elected during a fifth and final round of voting by the 58 members of the Executive Board, with a majority of 30 votes against 28 for the Qatari candidate, who suffered from the division of the Arab world, exacerbated by the Gulf crisis. Audrey Azoulay was the second woman to be elected to this position, after Irina Bokova whom she succeeded.

The final choice was submitted to the General Conference made up of the 195 member states on 10 November 2017, which endorsed her election to head the Organization. She was officially sworn in on 13 November 2017 at the Organization's headquarters in Paris.

==== Strategic vision ====
During the election process, the United States, followed by Israel, announced its withdrawal from the organisation, effective at the end of 2018, although the US remained an observer.

Azoulay stressed in her first speech after her election, "At a time of crisis, it is more important than ever to get even more involved, to seek to strengthen [UNESCO], not to leave it", and that her first priority would be to restore the organisation's credibility and the confidence of its member states.

On 10 April 2018, Audrey Azoulay made her first speech to the UNESCO Executive Board, detailing her vision for the organisation, her top priorities being Africa, gender equality, and education. She wanted to strengthen the prevention of violent extremism, particularly by initiating a prevention program "through youth empowerment in Jordan, Libya, Morocco, and Tunisia", and by publishing a guide for educational communities to combat anti-Semitism.

==== First term (2017–2021) ====
In 2019, Le Monde outlined her achievements: in 2018, she succeeded in "demining crucial issues that for years had crystallized conflicts within UNESCO": she succeeded in having a text on the preservation of the walls of the Old City of Jerusalem adopted by consensus, including by the Israeli representative, six months before his departure from UNESCO, and the Palestinian representative; she also reached an agreement between Japan and South Korea on the tragedy of the "comfort women" rounded up by the Japanese during the Second World War, and obtained a joint submission from North and South Korea for the inclusion of traditional Korean wrestling on the List of Intangible Cultural Heritage of Humanity.

===== Reconstruction of the Old City of Mosul =====
In February 2018, she launched the Revive the Spirit of Mosul initiative to rebuild the historic center of Iraq's second-largest city destroyed during its occupation by the Islamic State. To implement this project, she raises $50.4 million from the United Arab Emirates, $38.5 million from the European Union and $16.6 million from other countries and funds. With completion planned for 2024, the initiative will have enabled the reconstruction of the Al-Saa'a Convent, the Al-Nouri Mosque and Al-Hadba Minaret, the Al-Tahera Church, as well as the rehabilitation of 124 historic houses. These UNESCO projects have generated more than 6,000 local jobs.

===== Ethics of artificial intelligence =====
In February 2019, UNESCO published a Preliminary Study on the Ethics of Artificial Intelligence, the first step towards the creation of a global framework on ethics in this field as proposed by Audrey Azoulay at the beginning of her mandate. Opening a conference at UNESCO Headquarters in March 2019, she stressed that “trust in these innovations will be earned at the price of this collective effort. Transparency, fairness, elimination of bias, particularly gender bias, responsibility, inclusion, debate on the rules embedded in algorithms: these are all issues that need to be addressed ab initio and not after the uses and developments are already in place.”

===== Fire at Notre-Dame Cathedral in Paris =====
In April 2019, following the fire at Notre-Dame de Paris, she proposed UNESCO's assistance for "a very short-term assessment of the structure and materials".

===== Increase in UNESCO's budget =====
In November 2019, at the 40th UNESCO General Conference, the 193 Member States unanimously approved an increase in the compulsory contributions of each countries: Le Monde points out that this is "the first in years", "in the midst of a UN meltdown", and gives credit to Audrey Azoulay, while UNESCO "was, until two years ago, on the verge of bankruptcy, weakened by the withdrawal, which became effective at the end of 2018, of the United States and Israel". Le Monde also reported that, in addition to support from Europeans and Africans, she had also found support in the Arab world, notably in Morocco and Jordan, even though she was elected during a period when the Arab countries were divided.

===== Education during the COVID-19 pandemic =====
In March 2020, with 87% of the world's school and student population affected by school closures due to the COVID-19 pandemic, Audrey Azoulay launches a "Global Education Coalition", calling for "coordinated and innovative action to build solutions that will not only support students and teachers now, but throughout the recovery process". More than 200 public, associative and private actors have joined this initiative. Within this initiative, UNESCO is running more than 230 projects in 112 countries, benefiting 400 million pupils and 12 million teachers.

===== Li-Beirut initiative =====
Three weeks after the double explosion in the port of Beirut on 4 August 2020, Azoulay visited the city and pledged that UNESCO would coordinate the rehabilitation of the 280 damaged educational institutions. UNESCO mobilized almost 35 million dollars. Rehabilitation is fully completed eighteen months later. UNESCO also provided assistance to the cultural sector, notably by rehabilitating the Sursock Museum and restoring 12 historic buildings and 17 paintings damaged by the explosion.

==== Re-election ====
On 9 November 2021, Azoulay was re-elected by a very large majority to a second term at the head of UNESCO during the 41st session of the Organization's General Conference in Paris.

According to France 24, "this re-election seems to confirm the strategy of depoliticization of the institution that she has sought since her election". For Le Monde, “under her leadership, highly sensitive Middle East issues, such as the heritage of Jerusalem, have been the subject of upstream negotiations to avoid pitfalls, even if it means postponing them. So much so that the United States and Israel, who left accusing UNESCO of anti-Israeli bias, are considering their return". On the other hand, "the UN agency has increased its number of unifying projects, such as the reconstruction of Mosul (recently visited by the Pope in Iraq), almost doubling its operating budget thanks to voluntary contributions (up 15% by 2020)", explained Le Figaro.

An Ethiopian diplomat quoted by AFP sums up: "When she arrived, UNESCO was in a bad state. Now, objectively speaking, the organization is in much better shape". Other sources in UNESCO have said corruption and cronyism have flourished during her tenure, leading a former ambassador to UNESCO to accuse her of bullying and abusing UNESCO staff.

==== End of mandate ====
During the 2025 UNESCO Director-General succession process, Firmin Edouard Matoko, one of Azoulay’s long-time deputies, was viewed as representing internal continuity, while the Egyptian candidate Khaled El-Enany symbolized renewal. Matoko was defeated in the election by 55 votes to 2.

Her term officially ended on 15 November 2025.

== Other activities ==
- Generation Unlimited, member of the board (since 2018)
- Joint United Nations Programme on HIV/AIDS (UNAIDS), ex officio member of the Committee of Cosponsoring Organizations (since 2017)
- International Gender Champions (IGC), member

== Recognition ==
In September 2024, Azoulay was awarded the Premio Sostenibilidad (Sustainability Award) in the Premios Vanguardia in Barcelona, Spain.

Political offices
Preceded by Fleur Pellerin	Minister of Culture; 2016–2017	Succeeded by Françoise Nyssen
Diplomatic posts
Preceded by Irina Bokova	Director-General of UNESCO; 2017–2025	Succeeded by Khaled al-Anani
