= Ministry of Tourism and Antiquities =

Government ministry of Egypt

Arab Republic of Egypt Ministry of Tourism and Antiquities
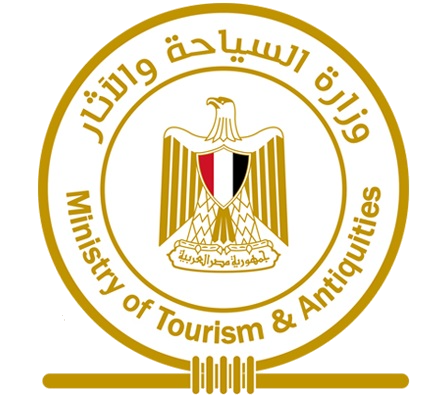

Agency overview
- Jurisdiction: Government of Egypt
- Headquarters: Zamalek, Cairo
- Agency executive: Ahmed Issa, Minister
- Child agency: Antiquities Repatriation
- Website: mota.gov.eg

The Ministry of Tourism and Antiquities (Arabic: وزارة السياحة والآثار, romanized: Wizārat al-Siyāḥah wa-al-Āthār) is the Egyptian government organization which serves to protect and preserve the heritage and ancient history of Egypt. In December 2019 it was merged into the Ministry of Tourism with Khaled al-Anani retaining his function. He was replaced by Ahmed Issa as Minister of Tourism and Antiquities in a cabinet reshuffle on 13 August 2022.

== History ==
It was formed from the Supreme Council of Antiquities in 2011 during the presidency of Hosni Mubarak to deal with the security and theft of Egyptian antiquities.

Grave robbers have been looting ancient Egyptian tombs nearly continuously for well over 4,000 years. The Ministry of Antiquities works to get the items restored back to Egypt, whenever possible. Over the years, thousands of stolen antiquities have made their way back to Egypt. For instance, in late 2016, the ministry recovered and repatriated two of four Islamic era lamps which had been stolen in 2015. In 2018, a carving in the shape of Osiris which had been hidden in furniture and shipped to Kuwait was repatriated to Egypt's Ministry of Antiquities.

In 2023, the ministry prohibited a group of archaeologists from the National Museum of Antiquities in Leiden, Netherlands from conducting excavations in Saqqara after the museum unveiled an exhibit about ancient Egyptian music that Egyptian authorities criticized for its Afrocentric depictions of certain figures, claiming it was historical negationism.

== Projects ==
From 2009 to 2014, the ministry worked with the Getty Conservation Institute on the management and conservation of the tomb of Tutankhamun.

== Past ministers ==
- Zahi Hawass 31 January 2011 – 3 March 2011
- Mamdouh Eldamaty June 2014 - March 2016
- Khaled al-Anani 23 March 2016 - 13 August 2022
- Ahmed Issa 13 August 2022 - Present

== Duties and goals ==
In 2016, the minister, Khaled El-Anany, stated his primary focus would be on solving the budget deficit of the ministry, given that many projects were stalled for lack of funding.

== See also ==
- Cabinet of Egypt
- Comité de Conservation des Monuments de l'Art Arabe
