= Montuherkhopshef (son of Ramesses III) =

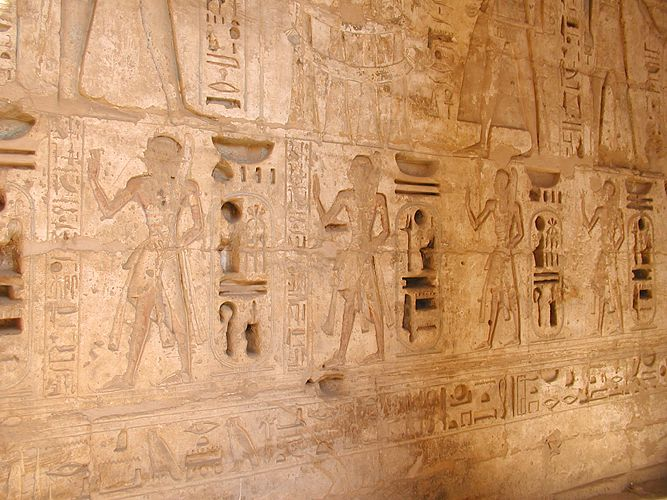
Princes's procession, Medinet Habu

mn n V13 D2 F24 f
Montuherkhopsef
in hieroglyphs
Era: New Kingdom
(1550–1069 BC)

Montuherkhopshef or Montuhirkhopshef was a Prince of the 20th Dynasty of Egypt and one of the sons of Ramesses III. He was thus a brother of Ramesses IV, Ramesses VI, Ramesses VIII and an uncle of Ramesses V and Ramesses VII.

He was the "First Charioteer of His Majesty", and married the queen Takhat who bears the prominent title of "King's Mother." This development supports the hypothesis that they are most probably the parents of king Ramesses IX since no other Ramesside king had a mother by this name, also, Ramesses IX had a son named Mentuherkhepeshef. Montuherkhepeshef is shown in the procession of princes in the Medinet Habu temple of Ramesses III. He is likely to be identical with the Prince Montuherkhepeshef buried in the tomb KV13 in the Valley of the Kings.

He never became Pharaoh, unlike his son Ramsses IX, or even crown prince because he died not only before his brother Ramsses VIII but also before his nephew Ramsses VII.
