= Ramesses IX =

Egyptian pharaoh of the 20th dynasty

- Also written Ramses and Rameses
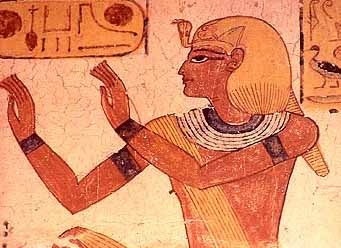
- Portrait of Ramesses IX from his tomb KV6.

Pharaoh
- Reign: 18 years, 4 months and 6 days 1128–1110 BC
- Predecessor: Ramesses VIII
- Successor: Ramesses X
Royal titulary
Horus name
Kanakht Khaemwaset
K3-nḫt-ḫˁ-m-W3s.t
Strong bull, he who appears (is enthroned) in Waset
G5	E2 D40 N28 Aa15 R19 X1 O49
Hieroglyphic variant:
G5	E2 D40 m N28 R19
Nebty name
Userkhepesh Sankhtawy
Wsr-ḫpš-sˁnḫ-t3.wj
He whose blow is powerful, he invigorates the two lands
G16 F12 T16 S29 S34 M13 M13
Hieroglyphic variant:
G16 wsr s r D43 F23 D43 G7 s n Aa1 N19 N23 N23
Golden Horus
Userrenputmiredjet
Wsr-rnp.wt-mj-Rˁ-ḏt
He who is long-lived litt. rich in years like Ra, forever
G8 F12 S29 M4 X1 Z2 W19 N5 Z1 D&t&N17
Variant:
wsr-rnpwt mi-ˁnḏti wr-nsyt dr-pḏt-9
He who is long-lived litt. rich in years like Andjety,
his kingdom is greater than the nine bows (the enemies of Egypt)
G8 F12 M4 M4 M4 W19 M17 A23 G36 D21 M23 X1 M17 M17 Z3 D46 D21 D43 T10 X1 Z2 Z2 Z2
Prenomen
Neferkare Setepenre
Nfr-k3-Rˁ-stp-n-Rˁ
Perfect is the Ka of Ra, the chosen one of Ra
M23 t L2 t < C2 nfr D28 N5 U19 n >
Nomen
Ramesses Khaemwaset Mereramun
Rˁ msj sw ḫˁj m W3s.t mrr Jmn
Ra fashioned him, he appears in Waset, beloved of Amun

G39 N5	N28 C2 R19 C12 N36 M23 F31 s r&r
- Consort: Baketwernel
- Children: Ramesses X?, Montuherkhepeshef, Nebmaatre
- Father: probably Montuherkhopshef (son of Ramesses III)
- Mother: probably Takhat
- Died: 1110 BC (aged c. 50)
- Burial: KV6; Mummy found in the Deir el-Bahri royal cache (Theban Necropolis)
- Dynasty: 20th Dynasty

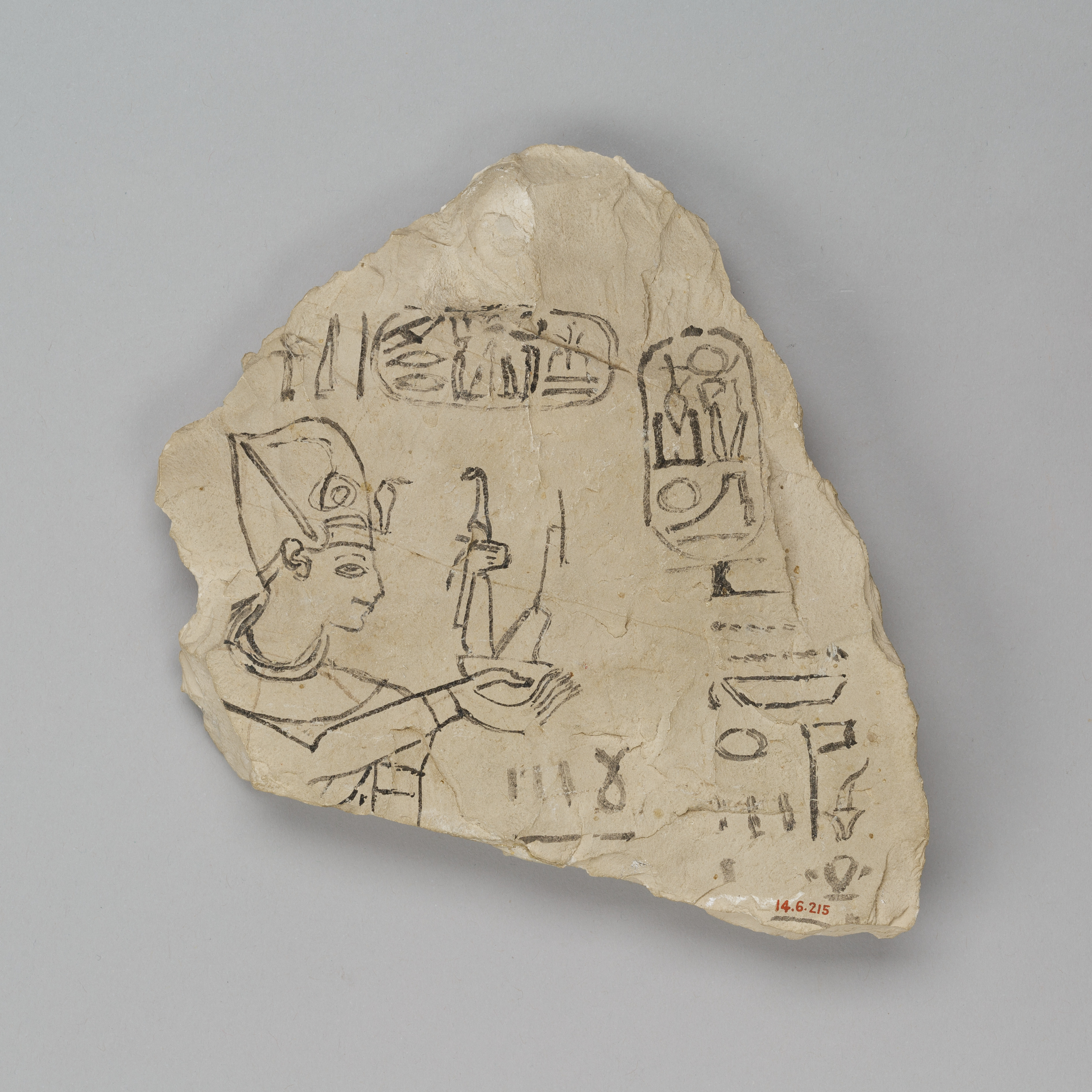
Ostracon Depicting Ramesses IX attributed to the chief draftsman Amenhotep

Neferkare Setepenre Ramesses IX (also written Ramses) (originally named Amon-her-khepshef Khaemwaset) (ruled 1128-1110 BC) or 1129–1111 BC) was the eighth pharaoh of the Twentieth Dynasty of Egypt.

He was the third longest serving king of this Dynasty after Ramesses III and Ramesses XI. His throne name, Neferkare Setepenre, means "Beautiful Is The Soul of Re, Chosen of Re." Ramesses IX is believed to be the son of Mentuherkhepeshef, a son of Ramesses III, since Mentuherkhopshef's wife, the lady Takhat bears the prominent title of King's Mother on the walls of tomb KV10, which she usurped and reused in the late 20th Dynasty; no other 20th Dynasty king is known to have had a mother with this name. Ramesses IX was, therefore, probably a grandson of Ramesses III.

== Reign ==
Jürgen von Beckerath (1984) argues he assumed the throne on I Akhet day 21.

=== Year 6 ===
In the sixth year of his reign, he inscribed his titulature in the Lower Nubian town of Amara West.

=== Year 16/17 Tomb robberies ===
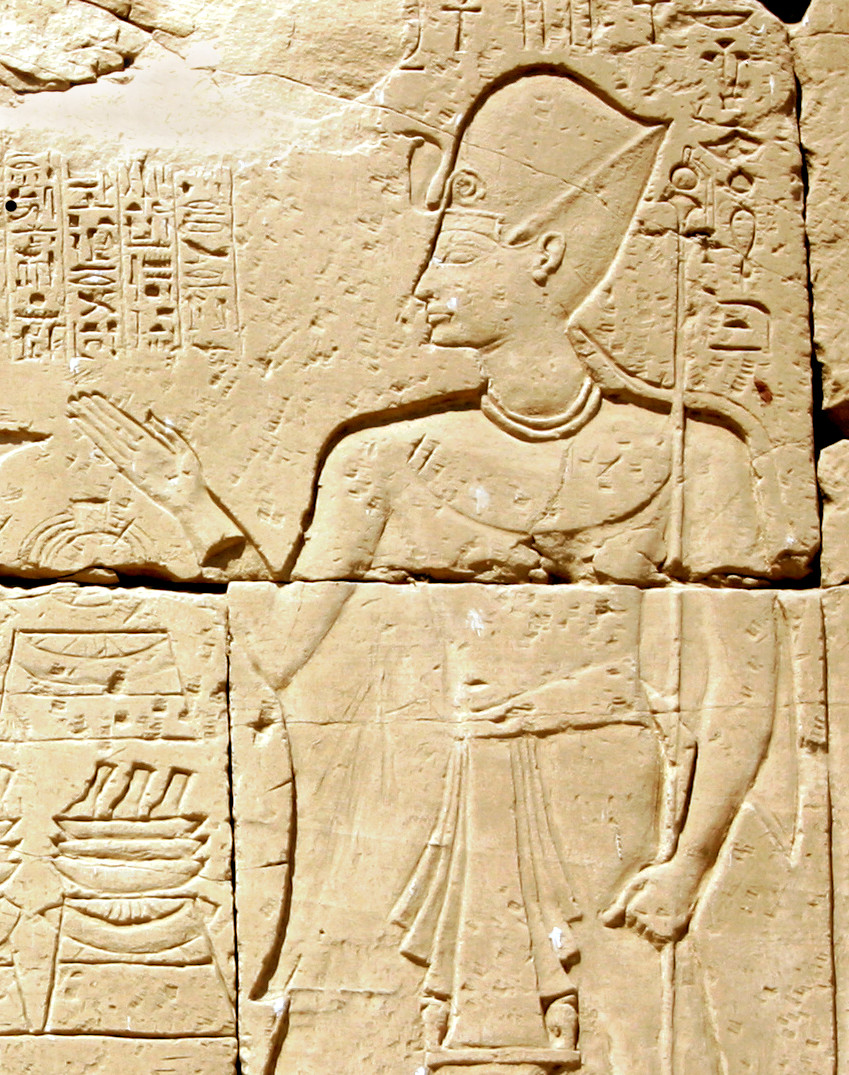
Relief of Ramesses IX at Karnak

His reign is best known for the year 16 and year 17 tomb robbery trials, recorded in the Abbott Papyrus, the Papyrus Leopold II, Papyrus BM 10054 and on the recto of both Papyrus BM 10053 and Papyrus BM 10068. It has been suggested that the undated Papyrus Mayer B, dealing with the plundering of the tomb of Ramesses VI, may also stem from his reign.

During these trials it became clear that several royal and noble tombs in the Western Theban Necropolis had been robbed, including that of a 17th Dynasty king, Sobekemsaf II. Paser, Mayor of Eastern Thebes or Karnak, accused his subordinate Paweraa, the Mayor of West Thebes responsible for the safety of the necropolis, of being either culpable in this wave of robberies or negligent in his duties of protecting the Valley of the Kings from incursions by tomb robbers. Paweraa played a leading part in the vizierial commission set up to investigate, and, not surprisingly, it proved impossible for Paweraa to be officially charged with any crime due to the circumstantiality of the evidence. Paser disappeared from sight soon after the report was filed.

Papyrus BM 10053 from Year 17 of this king records that 8 of the workmen of Deir El-Medina had "been apprehended by the local authorities somewhere within the west Theban necropolis, and [were] duly escorted across the river to the main city of Thebes." The workmen were interrogated for robbing a royal tomb--that of Queen Isis, Ramesses III's chief royal wife. They then disappear from history and were presumably executed by impalement for their crimes according to Benedict G. Davies.

=== Year 19 ===
According to the latest archaeological information, Ramesses IX died in Regnal Year 19 I Peret day 27 of his reign. Therefore, he enjoyed a reign of 18 years, 4 months and 6 days.

=== Projects ===
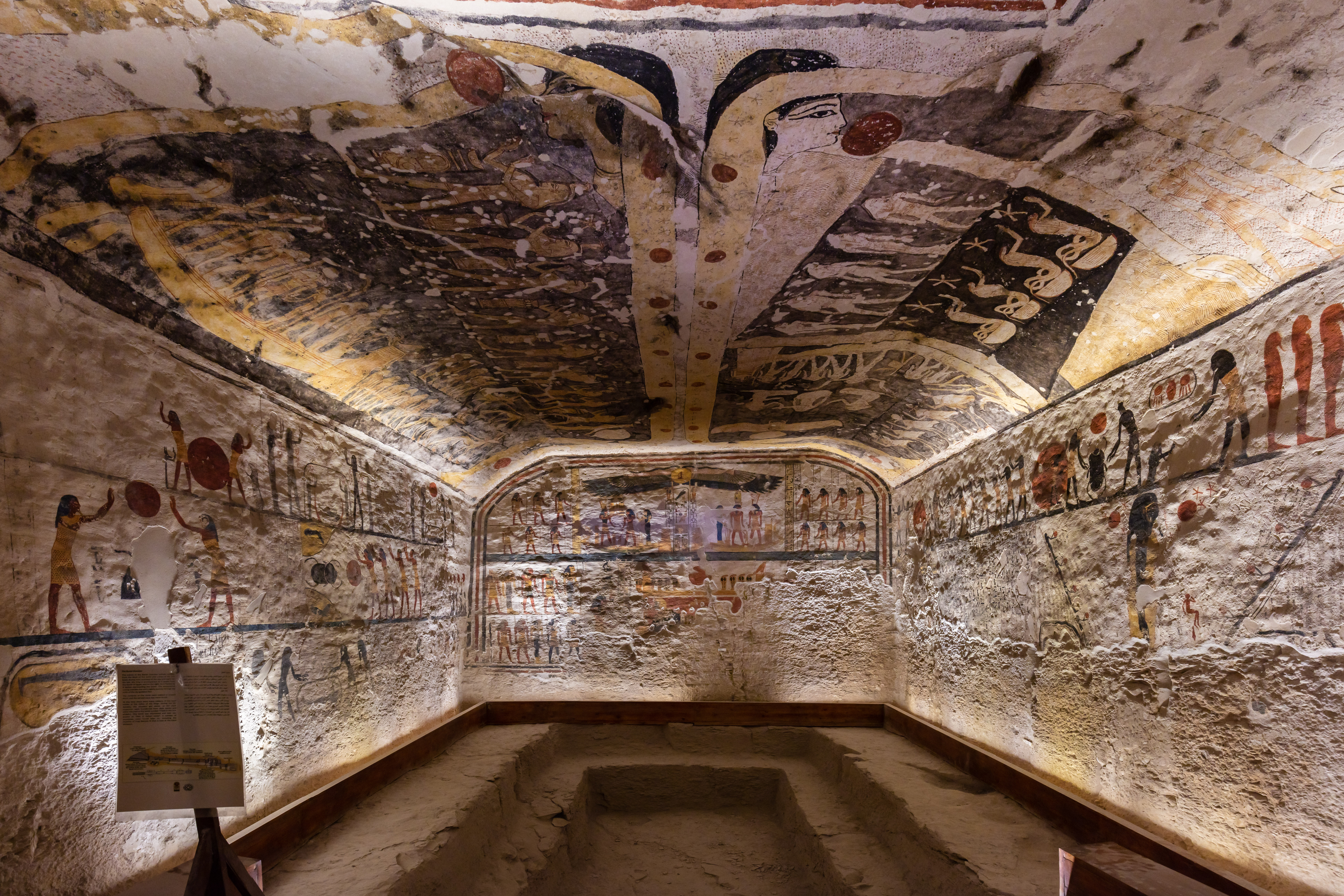
Burial chamber of Ramesses IX's KV6 royal tomb.

Most of his building works centre on the sun temple centre of Heliopolis in Lower Egypt where the most significant monumental works of his reign are located. However, he also decorated the wall to the north of the Seventh Pylon in the Temple of Amun-Re at Karnak. Finally, his name has been found at the Dakhla Oasis in Western Egypt and Gezer at Canaan which may suggest a residual Egyptian influence in Asia; the majority of the New Kingdom Empire's possessions in Canaan and Syria had long been lost to the Sea Peoples by his reign. He is also known for having honoured his predecessors Ramesses II, Ramesses III and Ramesses VII. He also paid close attention to Lower Egypt and built a substantial monument at Heliopolis.

== Family ==
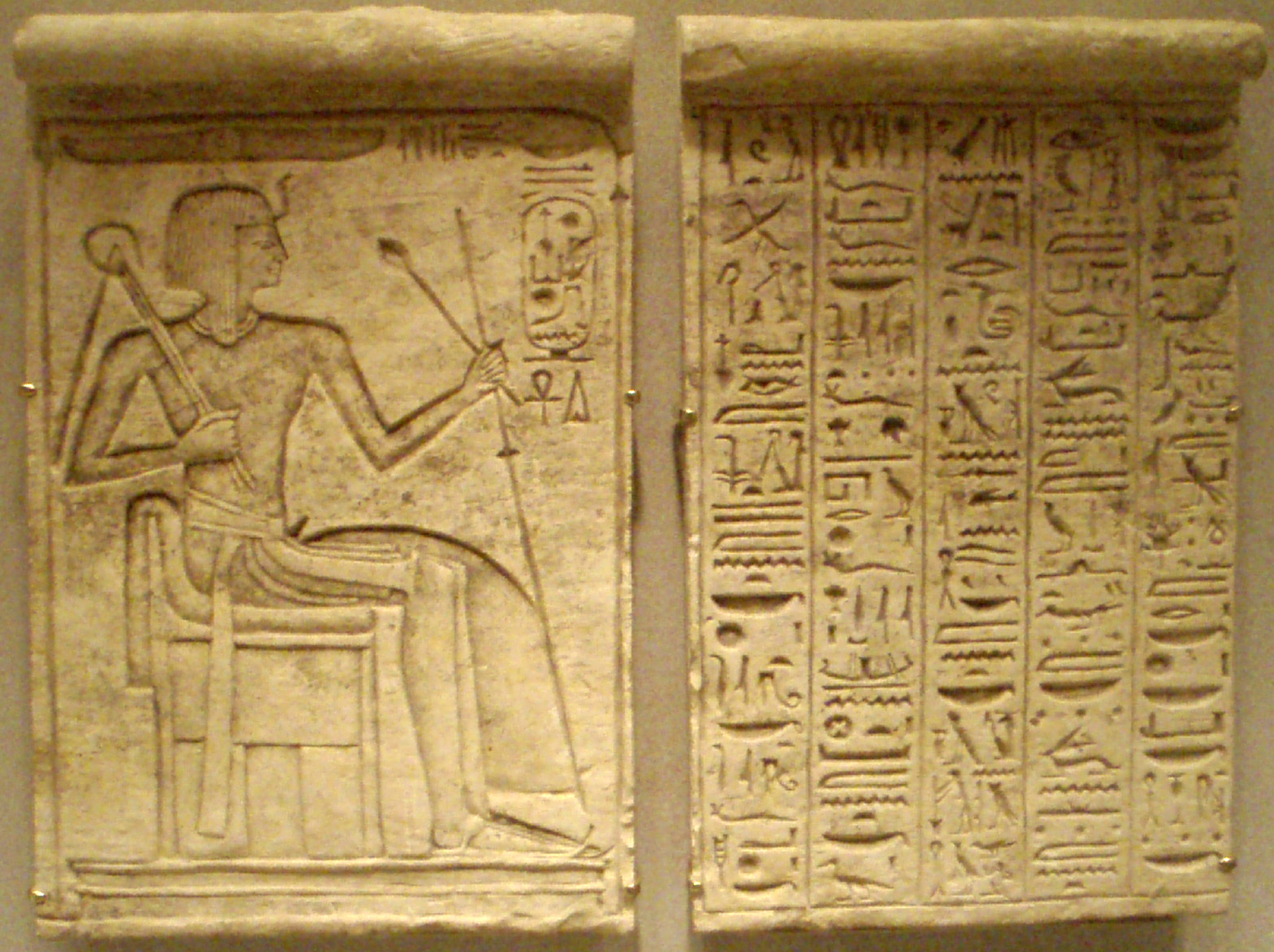
Relief of the pharaoh Ramesses IX from the Metropolitan Museum of Art

Ramesses IX is known to have had two sons: at Heliopolis, "a gateway was reinscribed with texts including the king's names and also those of the prince and High Priest Nebmaatre, who was fairly certainly his son." Ramesses IX's second son, Montuherkhopshef C, perhaps this king's intended heir, who did not live long enough to succeed his father, took over the former KV19 tomb of Sethirkhepsef B in the Valley of the Kings. The throne was instead assumed by Ramesses X whose precise relationship to Ramesses IX is unclear. Ramesses X might have been Ramesses IX's son, but this assumption remains unproven. Tomb KV19, which was one of the most beautifully decorated tombs in the royal valley, had been abandoned by Sethirkhepsef B when the latter assumed the throne as king Ramesses VIII and one of prince Montuherkhopshef's depictions there "bears the prenomen cartouche to Ramesses IX on its belt" thereby establishing the identity of this prince's father.

While Ramesses IX's chief queen is not precisely identified in surviving Egyptian inscriptions, she was most likely Baketwernel.

== Death ==
=== Tomb ===
At Thebes, the Tomb of Ramesses IX (KV6) has been open since antiquity, as is evidenced by the presence of Roman and Greek graffiti on the tomb walls. It is quite long in the tradition of the 'syringe' tunnels of the later 19th and 20th Dynasties and lies directly opposite the tomb of Ramesses II in the Valley of the Kings; this fact may have influenced Ramesses IX's choice of location for his final resting place due to its proximity to this great Pharaoh.

=== Mummy ===
In 1881, the mummy of Ramesses IX (nr. 5209) was found in the Deir el-Bahri cache (DB320) within one of the two coffins of Neskhons—wife of the Theban High Priest Pinedjem II. This pharaoh's mummy was not apparently examined by Grafton Elliot Smith and not included in his 1912 catalogue of the Royal Mummies. When the mummy was unwrapped by Maspero, a bandage was found from a year 5, mentioning the lady Neskhons, most probably from the reign of king Siamun. A further strip of linen from a year 7 identified the mummy as "Ra Khaemwaset" which can be taken as a reference to either Ramesses Khaemwaset Meryamun (IX) or Ramesses Khaemwaset Meryamun Neterheqainu (XI). But since an ivory box of Neferkare Ramesses IX was found in the royal cache itself, and Ramesses XI was probably never buried at Thebes but rather in Lower Egypt, "the [royal] mummy is most likely to be that of Ramesses IX himself." It is estimated that the king was about 50 years old when he died (but it is extremely difficult to correctly establish the age of mummies) and his mummy was found to have damaged by tomb robbers with broken limbs, a broken neck and damage to its nose, which is missing.

In April 2021 his mummy was moved from the Egyptian Museum to the National Museum of Egyptian Civilization along with those of 17 other kings and 4 queens in an event termed the Pharaohs' Golden Parade.

== Modern literature ==
The novel Ancient Evenings by Norman Mailer is told from the perspective of characters living during the reign of Ramesses IX, including Ramesses IX himself. Most but not all of the novel takes place on one long evening in 1123 or 1122 BCE, during which the characters (including Ramesses IX) tell stories of the past. The majority of the book concerns the reign of Ramesses II, approximately 150 years before the night of the narrative; the Battle of Kadesh (1274 BCE) is in turn the central event of this sub-narrative.

== See also ==
- Ramesses IX Tomb-plan Ostracon

Preceded by Ramesses VIII	Pharaoh of Egypt; Twentieth Dynasty	Succeeded by Ramesses X
