= Setepenre =

Ancient Egyptian name and title

stp ra n
Setepenre
in hieroglyphs

Setepenre is an often-used title of Egyptian kings (pharaohs), meaning "Elect of Re". It was also used as a personal name in at least two instances.

== Pronunciation ==
In Akkadian records, the name (referring to Ramesses II) is rendered in cuneiform script as šá-te-ep-na-ri/e-a. According to the Egyptologist Antonio Loprieno, the word was likely pronounced Satepna-rīꜥa ([satʰepʰna'riːʕa]).

== As a personal name ==
- Setepenre, last daughter of Akhenaten and Nefertiti (18th Dynasty)
- Setepenre, a son of Ramesses II (19th Dynasty)

== As a throne name ==
- Usermaatre Setepenre (Ramesses II)
- Userkheperure Setepenre (Seti II)
- Akhenre Setepenre (Siptah)
- Usermaatre Setepenre (Ramesses VII)
- Neferkare Setepenre Khaemwaset (Ramesses IX)
- Khepermaatre Setepenre (Ramesses X)
- Hedjkheperre Setepenre (Smendes I)
- Aakheperre Setepenre (Osorkon the Elder)
- Netjerkheperre Setepenre (Siamun)
- Titkheperure Setepenre (Psusennes II)
- Hedjkheperre Setepenre (Shoshenq I)
- Sekhemkheperre Setepenre (Osorkon I)
- Heqakheperre Setepenre (Shoshenq II)
- Hedjkheperre Setepenre (Takelot I)
- Usermaatre Setepenre (Shoshenq III)
- Hedjkheperre Setepenre (Takelot II)
- Hedjkheperre Setepenre (Shoshenq IV)
- Usermaatre Setepenre (Pami)
- Uasnetjerre Setepenre (Shoshenq VII, existence doubtful)
