= Ramesses VI =

Pharaoh of Egypt from 1144 to 1136 BC

- Ramses VI, Rameses VI, Ramesses VI Amunherkhepeshef C
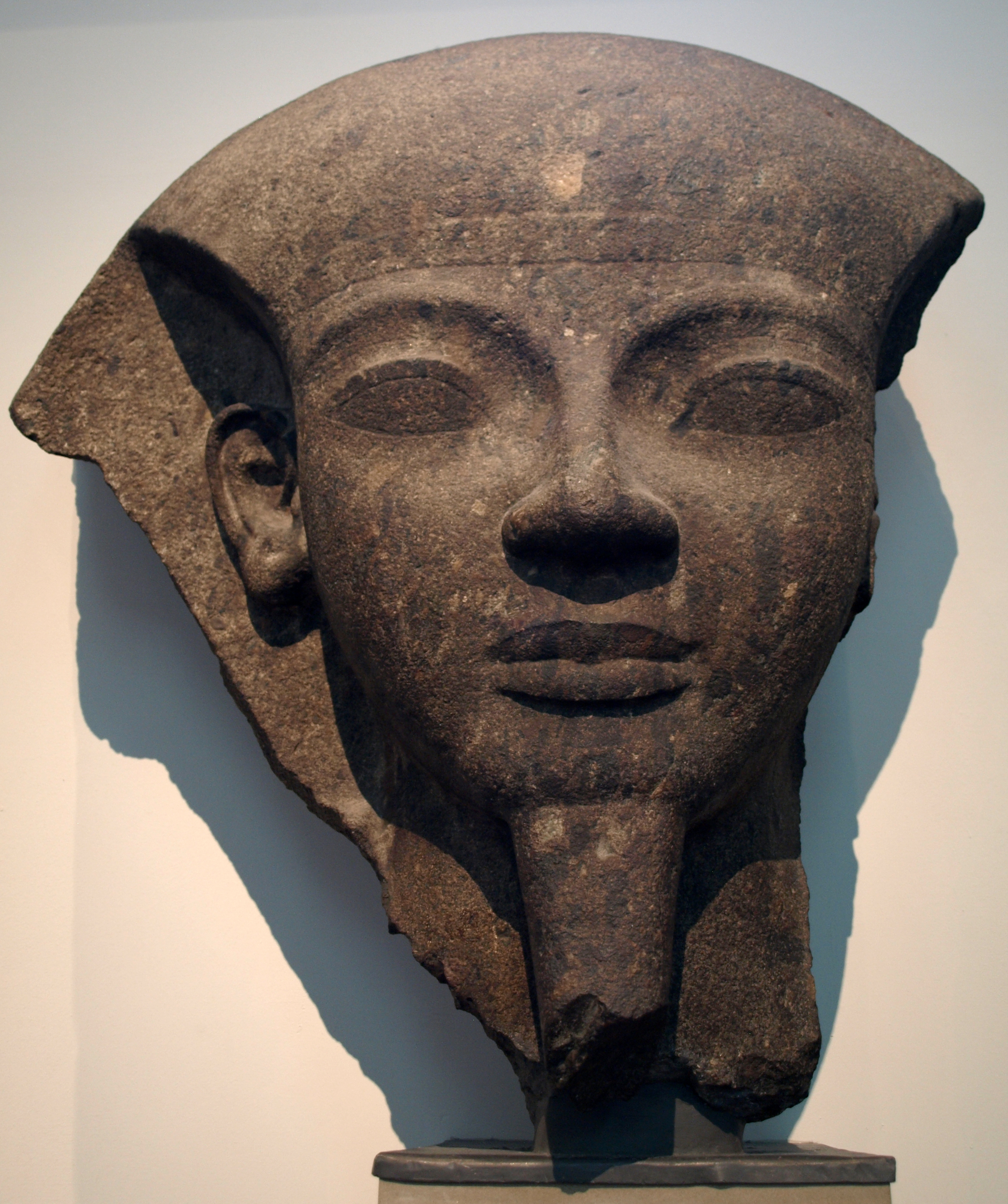
- Fragment of Ramesses VI's stone sarcophagus from his tomb now on display at the British Museum. The sarcophagus was originally painted, its stone quarried in the Wadi Hammamat.

Pharaoh
- Reign: 8 regnal years c. 1144-1136 BC mid 12th century BC
- Predecessor: Ramesses V
- Successor: Ramesses VII
Royal titulary
Horus name
Kanekhet Aanekhtu Sankhtawy
K3-nḫt-ˁ3-nḫt.w-sˁnḫ-t3w.j
Strong bull, whose victories are great, he who gives life to the two lands
G5	E1 D43 O29 D36 Y1 N35 M3 Aa1 X1 D43 Z2 S29 S34 N19
Nebty name
Weserkhepesh Hedhefenu
Wsr-ḫpš-hd-ḥfn.w
He whose blow is powerful, he whose attacks are countless
Alternative translation:
Powerful of arms, [in] attacking the myriads
G16	F12 S29 T16 O4 D46 Y1 D43 I8 Z2
Golden Horus
Weserrenput mi Tatenen
Wsr-rnp.wt-mj-T3-ṯnn
Rich in years like Tatenen
G8	F12 S29 M4 M4 M4 W19 N17 V13 M22 M22 N35 N35
Prenomen
Nebmaatre Meryamun
Nb-m3ˁ.t-Rˁ-mr.j-Jmn
Lord of the Maat like Ra, beloved of Amun
M23 t L2 t < N5 C12 C10 N36 V30 >
Nomen
Ramesisu Amunherkhepeshef Netjerheqaiunu
Rˁ-mss Jmn ḥr ḫpš=f nṯr-ḥqȝ-Jwnw
Ra fashioned him, Amun is his strength, divine ruler of Heliopolis

G39 N5	N5 C12 F31 O34 O34 R8 S38 O28
- Consort: Nubkhesbed
- Children: Iset ♀, Ramesses VII ♂, Amenherkhepshef ♂, Panebenkemyt ♂ uncertain: Ramesses IX ♂
- Father: Ramesses III
- Mother: Iset Ta-Hemdjert
- Died: c. 1136 BC (aged in his 40s)
- Burial: KV9; Mummy found in the KV35 royal cache (Theban Necropolis)
- Dynasty: 20th Dynasty

Ramesses VI Nebmaatre-Meryamun (sometimes written Ramses or Rameses, also known under his princely name of Amenherkhepshef C (Note: The "C" in this name is not part of Ramesses VI's original Egyptian name, rather it is a denomination added in modern Egyptology to distinguish him from other people of the same name: Amenherkhepshef A, a son of Ramesses II, Amenherkhepshef B, a son of Ramesses III, and Amenherkhepshef D, a son of Ramesses VI.)) was the fifth ruler of the Twentieth Dynasty of Egypt. He reigned for about eight years in the mid-to-late 12th century BC and was a son of Ramesses III and queen Iset Ta-Hemdjert. As a prince, he was known as Ramesses Amunherkhepeshef and held the titles of royal scribe and cavalry general. He was succeeded by his son, Ramesses VII Itamun, whom he had fathered with queen Nubkhesbed.

After the death of the ruling pharaoh, Ramesses V, who was the son of Ramesses VI's older brother, Ramesses IV, Ramesses VI ascended the throne. In the first two years after his coronation, Ramesses VI stopped frequent raids by Libyan or Egyptian marauders in Upper Egypt and buried his predecessor in what is now an unknown tomb of the Theban necropolis. Ramesses VI usurped KV9, a tomb in the Valley of the Kings planned by and for Ramesses V, and had it enlarged and redecorated for himself. The craftsmen's huts near the entrance of KV9 covered up the entrance to Tutankhamun's tomb, saving it from a wave of tomb robberies that occurred within 20 years of Ramesses VI's death. Ramesses VI may have planned and made six more tombs in the Valley of the Queens, none which are known today.

Egypt lost control of its last strongholds in Canaan around the time of Ramesses VI's reign. Though Egyptian occupation in Nubia continued, the loss of the Asiatic territories strained Egypt's weakening economy and increased prices. With construction projects increasingly hard to fund, Ramesses VI usurped the monuments of his forefathers by engraving his cartouches over theirs. Yet he boasted of having "[covered] all the land with great monuments in my name [...] built in honour of my fathers the gods". He was fond of cult statues of himself; more are known to portray him than any Twentieth-Dynasty king after Ramesses III. The Egyptologist Amin Amer characterises Ramesses VI as "a king who wished to pose as a great pharaoh in an age of unrest and decline".

The pharaoh's power waned in Upper Egypt during Ramesses VI's rule. Though his daughter Iset was named God's Wife of Amun, the high-priest of Amun, Ramessesnakht, turned Thebes into Egypt's religious capital and a second center of power on par with Pi-Ramesses in Lower Egypt, where the pharaoh resided. In spite of these developments, there is no evidence that Ramessesnakht's dynasty worked against royal interests, which suggests that the Ramesside kings may have approved of these evolutions. Ramesses VI died in his forties, in his eighth or ninth year of rule. His mummy lay untouched in his tomb for fewer than 20 years before pillagers damaged it. The body was moved to KV35 during the reign of Pinedjem I, and was discovered in 1898 by Victor Loret. His mummy is currently kept in the National Museum of Egyptian Civilization.

== Family ==
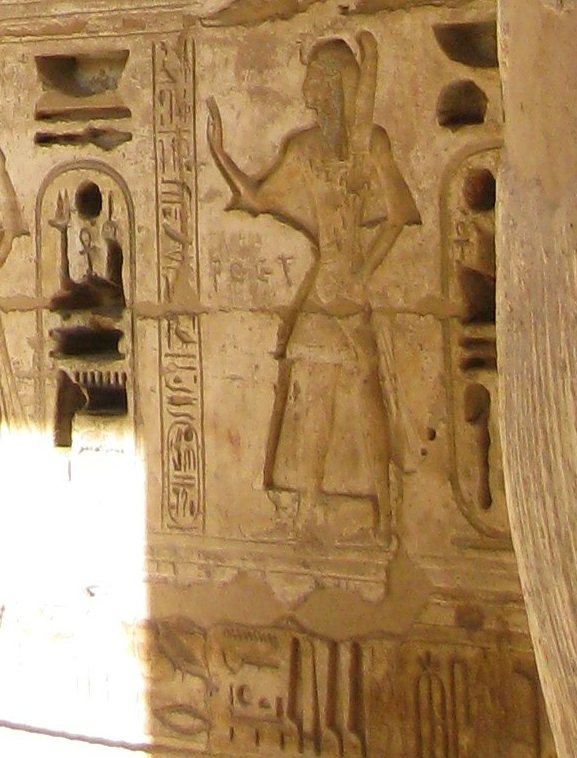
Prince Amunherkhepeshef is shown on the "Procession of the Princes" relief in Medinet Habu.

=== Parents and early life ===
Ramesses VI was a son of Ramesses III, the latter being considered the last great pharaoh of the New Kingdom period. This filiation is established beyond doubt by a large relief found in the portico of the Medinet Habu temple of Ramesses III known as the "Procession of the Princes". The relief shows ten princes including Ramesses VI, worshipping their father. Ramesses III's sculptors seem to have left the relief incomplete; only the figures of the king and princes appear and no names are written in the spaces next to them. (Note: That the relief was left unfinished with no text during Ramesses III's reign is indicated by the fact that the text refers to various princes as pharaoh and coincides with modification of the princes' figures to add royal attributes. In addition, all of the princesses are still lacking their names, which were never added.) The relief seems to have originally been executed when Ramesses VI was still a young prince, as he is shown wearing the sidelock of youth used to denote childhood. When Ramesses VI became king, he added his princely names "Ramesses Amunherkhepeshef" (Note: Ramesses VI was the second prince to bear the name Amunherkhepeshef. Consequently, he is sometimes referred to as Amunherkhepeshef II in modern Egyptology.) inside royal cartouches as well as the titles he held before ascending the throne as "king's son of his body, his beloved, crown prince, royal scribe [and] cavalry general". He altered his youthful figure on the "Procession of the Princes" with an uraeus underscoring his royal status and further completed the relief with the names of all his brothers and sons, with the exception of Ramesses IV, who had already written his royal name on the relief.

Interestingly, Ramesses VI had a older brother also named Amunherkhepeshef, who was the eldest son and appointed heir of Pharaoh Ramesses III. He predeceased their father and it appears that the future Ramesses VI was named after him.

Speculation in Egyptology during the 1960s and 1970s concerning the chronology and genealogy of the Twentieth Dynasty as well as uncertainties affecting the identity of the king shown on the "Procession of princes" relief led some scholars to propose that Ramesses VI was a grandson of Ramesses III and the son either of an unknown prince or of the infamous Pentawer involved in the murder of Ramesses III. Such hypotheses have now been conclusively rejected and the relief is understood to mean exactly what it shows: that Ramesses VI was the son of Ramesses III. (Note: The publication which led to the modern consensus on Ramesses VI's filiation is due to the Egyptologist Kenneth Kitchen, who offered a point by point rebuttal of the arguments hitherto advanced by Kurt Sethe and others to posit that Ramesses VI was a grandson of Ramesses III rather than his son. First, Kitchen rejects the initial interpretation of the titles borne by princes on the relief, in particular Sethe's reading of the title of "king's first born son" is provably wrong as several princes bore the title, which should be understood as "king's eldest surviving son". It follows that Sethe's rejection of princes Praherwonmefs as sons of Ramesses III is invalid and that the relief can present sons of this king. Second Sethe rejected the filiation of Ramesses VI on the basis that it would be unlikely if not impossible that several sons of Ramesses III bore the same name, Amunherkhepeshef and therefore that the two mentions of this name on the relief refer to the same Ramesses VI, which would be suspect for a list of princes. Kitchen points out well-known examples, including princes Meryre I and II on a relief presenting sons of Ramesses II, showing that instead it was common for several sons of kings to bear the same name and thus that the two Amunherkhepeshef are distinct persons. Third, Sethe thought it improbable that three sons of a ruler could have ascended the throne. Kitchen points out the short reigns of the rulers of the 20th Dynasty after Ramesses III, so that the proposed sons ruled within 20 years of their father's death, far from impossible. Fourth, Kitchen points out the wrong argument that the cartouche next to Ramesses IV's figure simply reads Ramesses, which this ruler would have deemed insufficient to distinguish himself and thus that the figure is not Ramesses IV but someone else. As noted by Kitchen, the titles given to this figure are sufficient to identify Ramesses IV beyond doubt. Fifth, Sethe and others believe that Ramesses VI implemented a damnatio memoriae against Ramesses IV and V, which they explain through complicated dynastic struggles. But this damnatio memoriae is, in the terms of Kitchen "wholly imaginary" and indeed archaeological evidence has since established that Ramesses VI only erased the cartouches of his predecessor to gain visibility for his, and not in any systematic manner. Lastly, Sethe and Peet pointed out that in her tomb, Ramesses VI's mother is not given the title of king's wife and thus deduce that Ramesses VI was the son of a non-royal father. But Kitchen points out that this absence is no evidence, for example, Ramesses II's mother herself is never given the title of king's wife in her tomb, yet it is well established that she was Sethi I's queen.) Ramesses VI's mother was probably Iset Ta-Hemdjert, Ramesses III's Great Royal Wife, as suggested by the presence of Ramesses VI's cartouches on a door-jamb of her tomb in the Valley of the Queens.

=== Consort and children ===
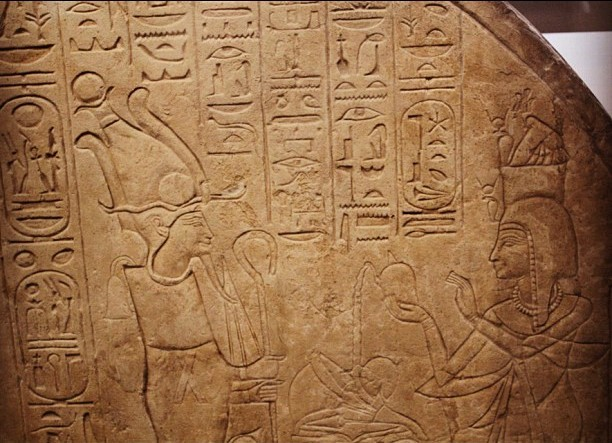
Koptos stela of Ramesses VI's daughter Iset (to the right)

Ramesses VI's Great Royal Wife was queen Nubkhesbed. The Egyptologists Aidan Dodson and Dyan Hilton believe that she bore Ramesses VI a total of four children: the princes Amenherkhepshef, Panebenkemyt (Note: The filiation of Panebenkemyt is established by a depiction of him on a statue of his father, now in the Luxor Museum.) and Ramesses Itamun—the future pharaoh Ramesses VII who succeeded his father for a short while on the throne—and princess Iset who was appointed to the priestly role of "Divine Adoratrice of Amun". A stela recounting this appointment was discovered in Koptos and demonstrates that Nubkhesbed was indeed Iset's mother.

Prince Amenherkhepshef died before his father and was buried in tomb KV13 in the Valley of the Kings, originally built for Chancellor Bay, an important official of the late Nineteenth Dynasty. The tomb decoration was updated in consequence, some reliefs notably mentioning Nubkhesbed. Amenherkhepshef's sarcophagus was usurped from queen Twosret.

The filiation of Ramesses VII is established by an inscription on a doorjamb from Deir el-Medinaeh which reads "the good god, lord of the two lands, Usimaare-meryamun-setepenre, Son of Re, lord of epiphanies, Ramesses [VII], (It)-Amun, god, ruler of Heliopolis—he has made as his monument for his father, (may) live the good god, lord of the two lands, Nebmaare-meryamun, Son of Re, [Ramesses VI]".

The Egyptologists James Harris, Edward F. Wente and Kenneth Kitchen have also proposed, based on circumstantial evidence, that Ramesses IX was a son of Ramesses VI and thus a brother to Ramesses VII. They note that Ramesses IX honoured Ramesses VII on two offering stands, suggesting that they were close kin. Ramesses IX named one of his sons Nebmaatre, which is Ramesses VI's prenomen, possibly as a means to honour his father. (Note: If the hypothesis regarding Ramesses IX's filiation is correct, then Kitchen adds that queen Tyti might have been a daughter of Ramesses VI, the wife of Ramesses IX and mother of Ramesses X. New evidence emerging from the publication of tomb-robbers accounts in 2010 established that Tyti was in fact the wife and sister of Ramesses III and possibly the mother of Ramesses IV.) This hypothesis is contested by other scholars including Dodson and Hilton, who believe that Ramesses IX was instead a son of prince Montuherkhopshef and thus a nephew to Ramesses VI. They base their conclusion on other circumstantial evidence: first is a depiction of Montuherkhopshef in KV19 on which Ramesses IX's prenomen had been added. Second is the fact that Ramesses IX's mother was named Takhat and Montuherkhopshef's spouse might have been a lady of the same name, hence possibly the same person.

== Reign ==
=== Reign length ===
Ramesses VI assumed the throne around the interval between Year 1 I Peret day 25 and Year 1 II Peret day 11 of his reign when his predecessor Ramesses V died. The scholarly consensus is now that Ramesses VI reigned in the mid 12th century BC over a period of eight full years and lived for two months into his brief unattested ninth regnal year which was inferred by Egyptologists. More precisely, the Egyptologist Steve Vinson proposed that he reigned between 1156 BC and 1149 BC, while the Encyclopædia Britannica reports 1145–1137 BC, Jürgen von Beckerath gives 1142–1134 BC, Erik Hornung 1145–1139 BC, Nicolas Grimal 1144–1136 BC making him a contemporary of Nebuchadrezzar I of Isin, Ian Shaw, Jacobus van Dijk and Michael Rice 1143–1136 BC, and 1132–1125 BC in a 2017 study.

In 1977, the Egyptologists Edward F. Wente and Charles van Siclen were the first to propose, upon reviewing the chronology of the New Kingdom period, that Ramesses VI lived into his eighth year of reign. This hypothesis was vindicated the next year by the Egyptologist Jac Janssen, who published an analysis of an ostracon (Note: Known today as Ostracon IFAO 1425.) which mentions the loan of an ox in the seventh and eighth years of an unnamed king who can only have been Ramesses VI. (Note: That the king in question is Ramesses VI is established by the dates recorded on the ostracon. It is mentioned that the first loan occurred on Year 7, I Peret 18 (that is on the 18th day of the first month of the season of Peret in the king's 7th year of reign) while the second took place on Year 8, II Peret 11. Furthermore the short duration of the loans which amounted to 15 days strongly suggest that these dates occurred in immediate succession and thus that they belong to the same reign. This indicates that the king referred to had ascended the throne between the 18th day of the first month of Peret and the 11th day of the second month of the same season. But the only king of the 19th and 20th Dynasties who ascended the throne in such a time-frame is Ramesses VI.) Two years later, Lanny Bell reported further evidence that Ramesses VI not only reigned into his eighth regnal year but most likely completed it and lived into his ninth. Ramesses VI's eighth year on the throne may also be mentioned in Theban graffito 1860a, which names the then serving High Priest of Amun, Ramessesnakht. This graffito was once ascribed to Ramesses X, but this interpretation has been contested and its ascription to Ramesses VI has been proposed as an alternative. since no dates are known for Ramesses X after his fourth regnal year. The subject remains debated. An important piece of evidence first recognised by Jansen in 1978 but fully exploited only five years later by the Egyptologist Raphael Ventura is found on the Turin Papyrus 1907+1908, which covers the time period from Ramesses VI's fifth year until Ramesses VII's seventh year on the throne. Ventura's analysis of the papyrus showed that 11 full years passed between Year 5 of Ramesses VI and Year 7 of Ramesses VII. The reconstruction of the document proposed by Ventura shows that the simplest solution available to explain the chronology of the period covered by the papyrus is that Ramesses VI enjoyed a reign of eight full years and two months, dying shortly in his ninth regnal year, and was succeeded by Ramesses VII rather than Ramesses VIII, as had been debated until then.

=== Activities and situation in Egypt ===
==== Early reign: strife in the Theban region ====
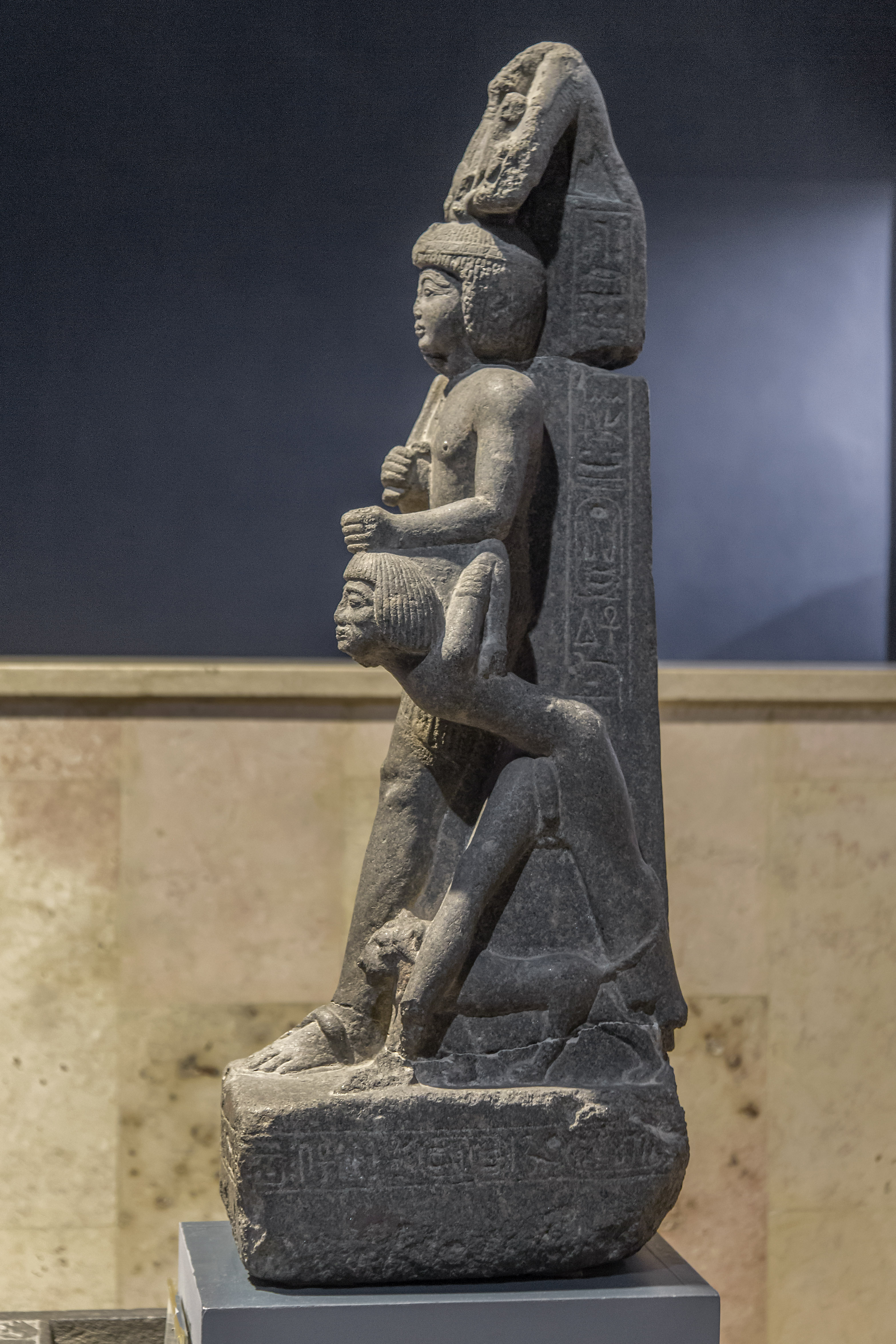
A statue from Karnak, now in the Egyptian Museum, shows Ramesses VI holding a bound Libyan captive.

Immediately after his accession to the throne, (Note: While the exact date of Ramesses VI's coronation is unknown, ancient sources indicate that he must have started his reign in winter, between the 28th day of the first month of the Season of the Emergence and the 11th day the second month of the same season. Janssen has more specifically argued for an accession of the eighth day of the second month of this season.) Ramesses VI and his court may have visited Thebes on the occasion of the Beautiful Festival of the Valley or the Opet Festival, concomitant with the preparations for Ramesses V's burial. Ramesses VI visited the city on at least another occasion during his reign, when he installed his daughter as Divine Adoratrice of Amun. The situation in the south of Egypt at the time of Ramesses VI's accession was not entirely stable, as attested by records showing that the workmen of Deir el-Bahari could not work on the king's tomb owing to the presence of "the enemy" in the vicinity, a situation which occurred over a period of at least fifteen days during Ramesses VI's first year on the throne. This "enemy" was rumoured to have pillaged and burned the locality of Per-Nebyt (Note: The location of Per-Nebyt is not known for certain. It may have been in north-Thebes.) and the chief of the Medjay of Thebes—essentially the police—ordered the workmen to remain idle and watch the king's tomb. It is unclear who these enemies were, the term could designate parties of Libyan Meshwesh, Libu and Egyptian bandits, or as the Egyptologist Jaroslav Černý conjectured, a full blown civil war between followers of Ramesses V and Ramesses VI, (Note: Černý's argument is that the term employed in the source to refer to the enemy is not the term that would be employed for foreign marauders such as Libyans. As a consequence, he sees the trouble-makers as Egyptians. Since furthermore the chief of the Medjay of Thebes seems not to have been involved in fighting the enemy, Černý believes that the troubles came from the North. Černý further conjectures that the civil war was a struggle between followers of Ramesses V and Ramesses VI, whom he sees as antagonists. Against this hypothesis is the observation that several high-officials continued their careers without disturbances from the time of Ramesses III until that of Ramesses VI and beyond, suggesting that the state was in fact politically stable.) a hypothesis supported by Rice but which has been strongly rejected by Kitchen and, to a lesser extent, by Grimal and van Dijk. A short military campaign might have ensued and from Ramesses VI's second year on the throne onwards these troubles seem to have stopped. This campaign could be connected with an unusual statue of Ramesses VI showing him holding a bound Libyan captive, as well as with a depiction of Ramesses VI triumphing over foreign soldiers on the second pylon of the Karnak temple. This triumph scene was the last one to be made in Egypt until the later reigns of Siamun (986–967 BC) and Shoshenq I (943–922 BC).

Other indications in favour of strife and military activities early in Ramesses VI's reign are the names he adopted upon ascending the throne, his Horus name meaning "Strong bull, great of victories, keeping alive the two lands" as well as his Nebty name "Powerful of arms, attacking the myriads".

==== Later reign ====
Following these events, on his second year of rule, Ramesses VI finally buried Ramesses V in a yet unidentified tomb in the Valley of the Kings, having usurped the tomb originally prepared for his predecessor. On the occasion of this visit to Thebes, Ramesses VI installed his daughter Iset as God's Wife of Amun and Divine Adoratice of Amun, in the presence of his mother, the acting vizier Nehy and other court officials. That same year, he ordered the reduction of the gang of workmen working on the king's tomb from 120 members to its former number of 60, which had been changed under Ramesses IV. (Note: This is indicated by a text on the verso of Ostracon Berlin P. 12654, which reads "So says the vizier: leave these sixty men here in the gang, whomsoever you choose, and send the rest away. Order that they should become conscript labour who carry [supplies] for you.") Following this, the community of workers at Deir el-Medina went into gradual decline, the settlement being finally abandoned in the subsequent Twenty-first Dynasty. In spite of the reduction, the Turin papyrus indicates that Ramesses VI ordered the construction of six tombs in the Valley of the Queens, a number which might include the hasty completion of the tomb of Iset Ta-Hemdjert, Ramesses' mother. It is unknown whether these tombs were finished and in any case, they are now unidentifiable. (Note: Tombs dating to the Twentieth Dynasty but which cannot be securely attributed to any specific reign are QV 24, 41, 45, 50, 54, 84, 85, 86. This list may include those built by Ramesses VI.)

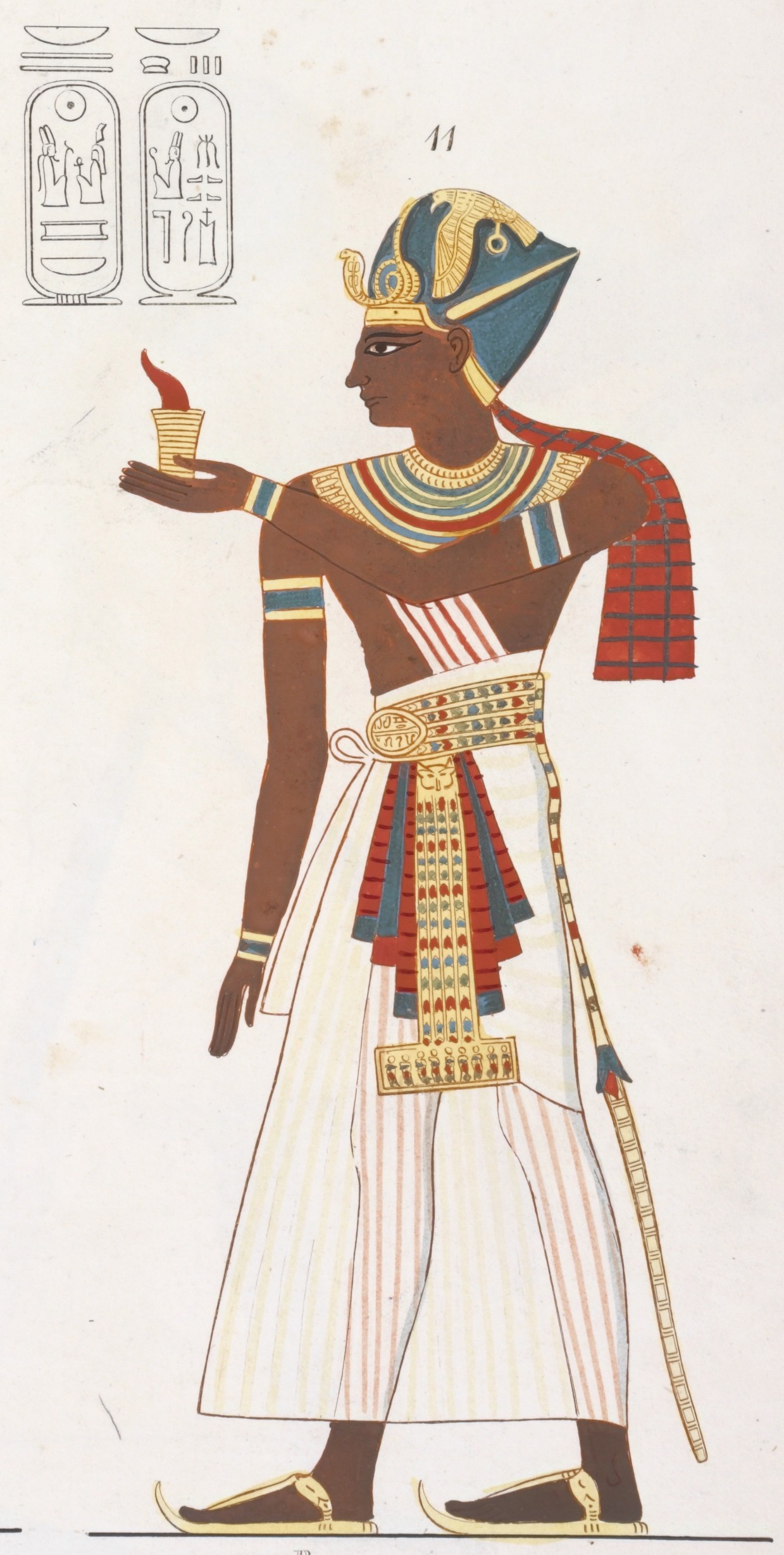
This portrait of Ramesses VI was copied during the Franco-Tuscan Expedition from a painting in the ruler's tomb.

At some point in his reign, a cult statue of Ramesses VI was installed in a shrine of Ramesses II in the temple of Hathor of Deir el-Medina. The statue was called "Lord of the Two Lands, Nebmaatre Meryamun, Son of Re, Lord of Crowns, Ramesses Amunherkhepeshef Divine Ruler of Iunu, Beloved like Amun". A complete description of it is given on the verso of the Turin Papyrus Map, celebrated for being the oldest surviving topographical map. The papyrus indicates that the statue was made of two essences of painted wood and clay, showing pharaoh wearing a golden loincloth, a crown of lapis-lazuli and precious stones, a uraeus of gold and sandals of electrum. The statue is said to receive three services of incense and libations every day. The text of the papyrus is a letter directly addressed to Ramesses VI asking that a certain man be put in charge of the offerings. The letter seems to have been received favourably by the king, as the author's grandson is known to have held the title of "High Priest of Nebmaatre [Ramesses VI], Beloved of Amun".

Ramesses VI was apparently fond of such cult statues and no less than ten statues and a sphinx have been discovered in Tanis, Bubastis and Karnak, more than any other Ramesside king of the Twentieth Dynasty following the reign of Ramesses III. The tomb of Penne, an Egyptian high-official in Nubia reports that Penne made a donation of lands to generate revenue towards the upkeep of yet another cult statue of Ramesses VI. Ramesses VI was so satisfied with this deed that he commanded his Viceroy of Kush "Give the two silver vessels of ointment of gums, to the deputy [Penne]".

While few of Ramesses VI's activities are known in details, he is well attested by numerous reliefs, inscriptions, statues and minor finds from Karnak, Koptos and Heliopolis. (Note: Small artefacts bearing Ramesses VI's cartouches are also known, including bronze and gold signet rings now in the collection of the Metropolitan Museum of Arts.)

==== Economic decline ====
Over the period spanning the reigns of Ramesses VI, VII and VIII, prices of basic commodities, in particular grain, rose sharply. With Egypt's economy getting weaker, Ramesses VI turned to usurping the statues and monuments of his forebears, frequently plastering and then carving his cartouches over theirs, in particular those of Ramesses IV which figured prominently along the processional routes in Karnak and Luxor. In other examples, he usurped a statue of Ramesses IV, (Note: The statue was found in the Karnak cache and is now in the Egyptian Museum, under the catalogue number 42153.) columns of texts inscribed by Ramesses IV on an obelisk of Thutmose I in Karnak, and the tomb of Ramesses V. Kitchen warns not to over-interpret these usurpations as signs of antagonism on behalf of Ramesses VI with respect to his older brother and nephew. The usurpations were not thorough but were rather targeted to the most prominent places, where Ramesses VI's cartouches would be most visible. Besides, Ramesses VI did leave cartouches of Ramesses IV intact in many places, including in places where both his name and that of his brother feature close to one another such as in the Medinet Habu temple of Ramesses III, so that the hypothesis of a damnatio memoriae—whereby all references to someone are systematically eliminated so as to remove this person from memory and history—can be eliminated.

A possible evidence for genuine architectural works on Ramesses VI's behalf is found in Memphis, where an inscription on a granite gateway cornice of the temple of Ptah claims that he erected a great pylon of fine stone. Ramesses VI then boasts of "covering all the land with great monuments in my name [...] built in honour of my fathers the gods". Overall, the Egyptologist Amin Amer characterises Ramesses VI as "a king who wished to pose as a great pharaoh in an age of unrest and decline".

=== Dilution of power ===
==== High officials ====
Some high officials of Ramesses VI are known, such as his finance minister and overseer of the treasury Montuemtawy (Note: Also called Mentemtowy in the modern literature.) who was in office since the end of Ramesses III's reign; the vizier Neferronpe in office since Ramesses IV's time on the throne; his son the vizier Nehy; Amenmose the mayor of Thebes and the king's butler Qedren. To the south, the troop commander of Kush was Nebmarenakhte and the administrator of Wawat—the land between the first and second cataracts of the Nile—mayor of Anîba and controller of the Temple of Horus at Derr was Penne.

==== The dynasty of Ramessesnakht ====
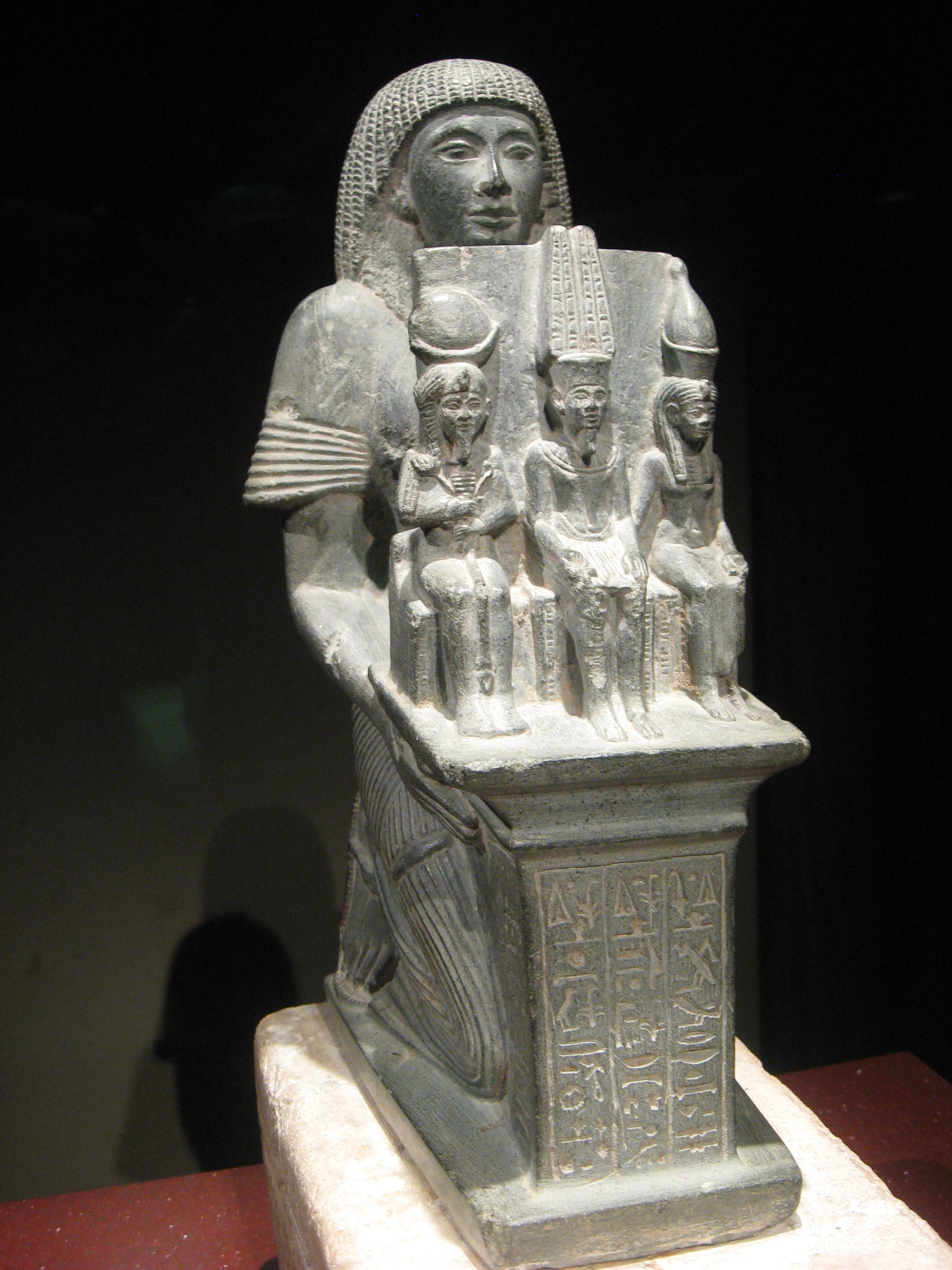
Ramessesnakht, high priest of Amun during Ramesses VI's reign, shown at the Egyptian Museum

In Thebes, the high-priesthood came under the control of Ramessesnakht and his family at the time of Ramesses IV, possibly owing to Ramessesnakht's father Merybaste's high control over the country's financial institutions. Ramessesnakht was officially Ramesses VI's Vizier of the South and his power grew at the expense of that of the pharaoh in spite of the fact that Iset was connected to the Amun priesthood as well "in her role as God's Wife of Amun or Divine Adoratice". If fact, Ramessesnakht most likely oversaw the construction of the funerary building of Iset in the tomb complex K93.12, and while, as the Egyptologist Daniel Polz puts it, "he and his relatives were the most powerful individuals in Egypt at the end of the Twentieth Dynasty", his activities were not directed against royal interests. Ramessesnakht often attended the distribution of supplies to workmen and controlled much of the activity connected with the construction of the king's tomb, possibly because the treasury of the high-priest of Amun was now at least partially funding these works. Ramessesnakht's son Usermarenakhte was made into the Steward of Amun and became administrator of large swaths of land in Middle Egypt. He also inherited the role of Merybaste as controller of the country's taxes, ensuring that Ramessesnakht's family was in full control of both the royal treasury and the treasury of Amun. Further high offices such as those of the second and third priests and of "god's father of Amun" were given to people who entered Ramesesnakht's family by marriage.

Ramessesnakht was powerful enough to build for himself one of the largest funerary establishments of the entire Theban necropolis at the end of the New Kingdom, when royal building projects including Ramesses VI's usurped mortuary temple had been abandoned. Ramessesnakht's monument, in Dra' Abu el-Naga', reused an earlier building dating back to the Seventeenth or Eighteenth Dynasty and was refurbished to show the political and economic standing of its owner. Overall, Egyptologists now estimate that Ramessesnakht and his dynasty essentially established a second centre of power in Upper Egypt, seemingly on the behalf of the Twentieth Dynasty kings who ruled from Memphis and Pi-Ramesses in Lower Egypt. This effectively made Thebes into the religious capital of Egypt as well as an administrative one on a par with its northern counterpart, laying the foundations for the rise of the Twenty-first Dynasty under Herihor and Pinedjem I, 50 to 70 years later.

=== Situation in Egypt's empire abroad ===
==== Final decline in Canaan ====
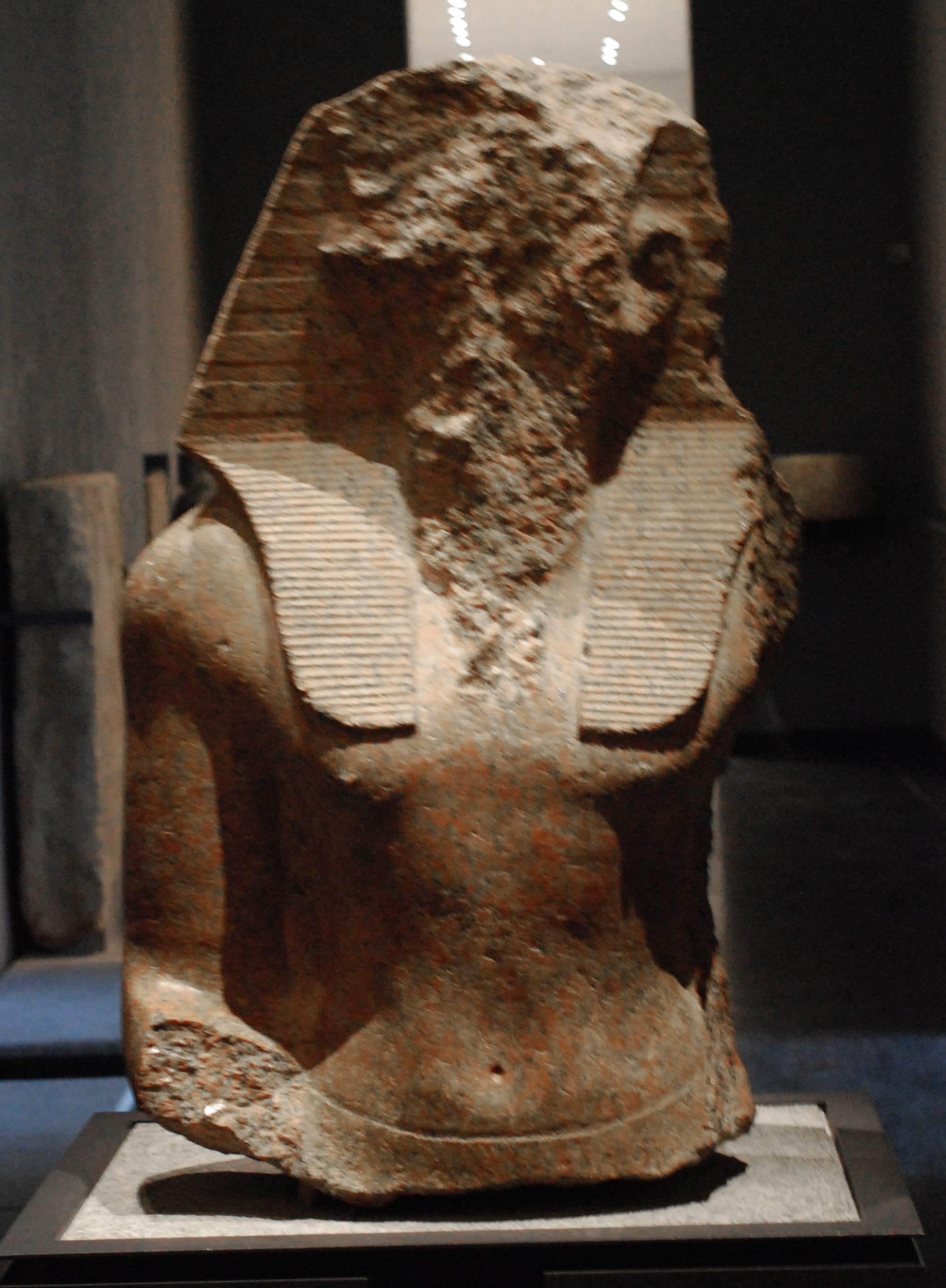
This broken bust of Ramesses VI is shown at the Museum of Fine Arts of Lyon.

Egypt's political and economic decline continued unabated during Ramesses VI's reign. He is the last king of the New Kingdom period whose name is attested on inscribed wall fragments as well as two pillars of the temple of Hathor of the Serabit el-Khadim in Sinai, where he sent expeditions to mine copper ore.

Egypt may nonetheless still have wielded some sort of influence or at least still had some connections with the remnants of its empire in the Levant, as suggested by the base of a fragmented bronze statue of Ramesses VI discovered in Megiddo in Canaan, and a scarab of his from Alalakh on the coast in southern Anatolia. (Note: The finds of the statue and scarab in Megiddo and Alalakh do not necessarily denote any strong Egyptian presence there as these kinds of artefacts were widely traded throughout the Mediterranean at the time.)

Egyptian presence in Canaan was terminated during or soon after Ramesses VI's rule, with the last garrisons leaving southern and western Palestine around the time, and the frontier between Egypt and abroad returning to a fortified line joining the Mediterranean to the Red Sea. A 2017 archaeological study reached the same conclusion, namely that Ramesses VI's reign is the terminus post quem for the presence of the Egyptian military in Jaffa, which was twice destroyed around this time period. Opponents of the Egyptian authority were of local extraction, probably originating in Canaanite cities of the Levantine coastal plain, an opposition to Egyptian hegemony ultimately resulting from the arrival of the Sea People in the region during the reign of Ramesses III. The loss of all Asiatic territories further strained the redistributive economy of Egypt's New Kingdom society, depriving the subsequent kings of much of their legitimacy.

==== Decline in the Sinai ====
According to the French Egyptologist Nicolas Grimal in his original French language 1988 book titled "A History of Ancient Egypt":

"The signs of decay were increasing. Egyptian dominance beyond the Nile valley had become more and more limited: Ramessses VI was the last ruler of the New Kingdom whose name is attested in the Sinai."

After Ramesses VI's reign, Sinai was presumably abandoned by the state administration of Egypt's final 20th Dynasty kings.

==== Continuing presence in Nubia ====
The Egyptian control of Nubia seems to have been much firmer at the time, owing either to the advanced Egyptianisation of the local population or to the economic importance of this region. Ramesses VI's cartouches have been uncovered on Sehel Island near Aswan and in Ramesses II's temple in Wadi es-Sebua. Ramesses VI is mentioned in the tomb of Penne in Anîba, not far from the Third Cataract of the Nile. Penne also recounts punitive military raids further south, from which he claims to have brought back loot to pharaoh.

== Funerary monuments ==
=== Tomb ===
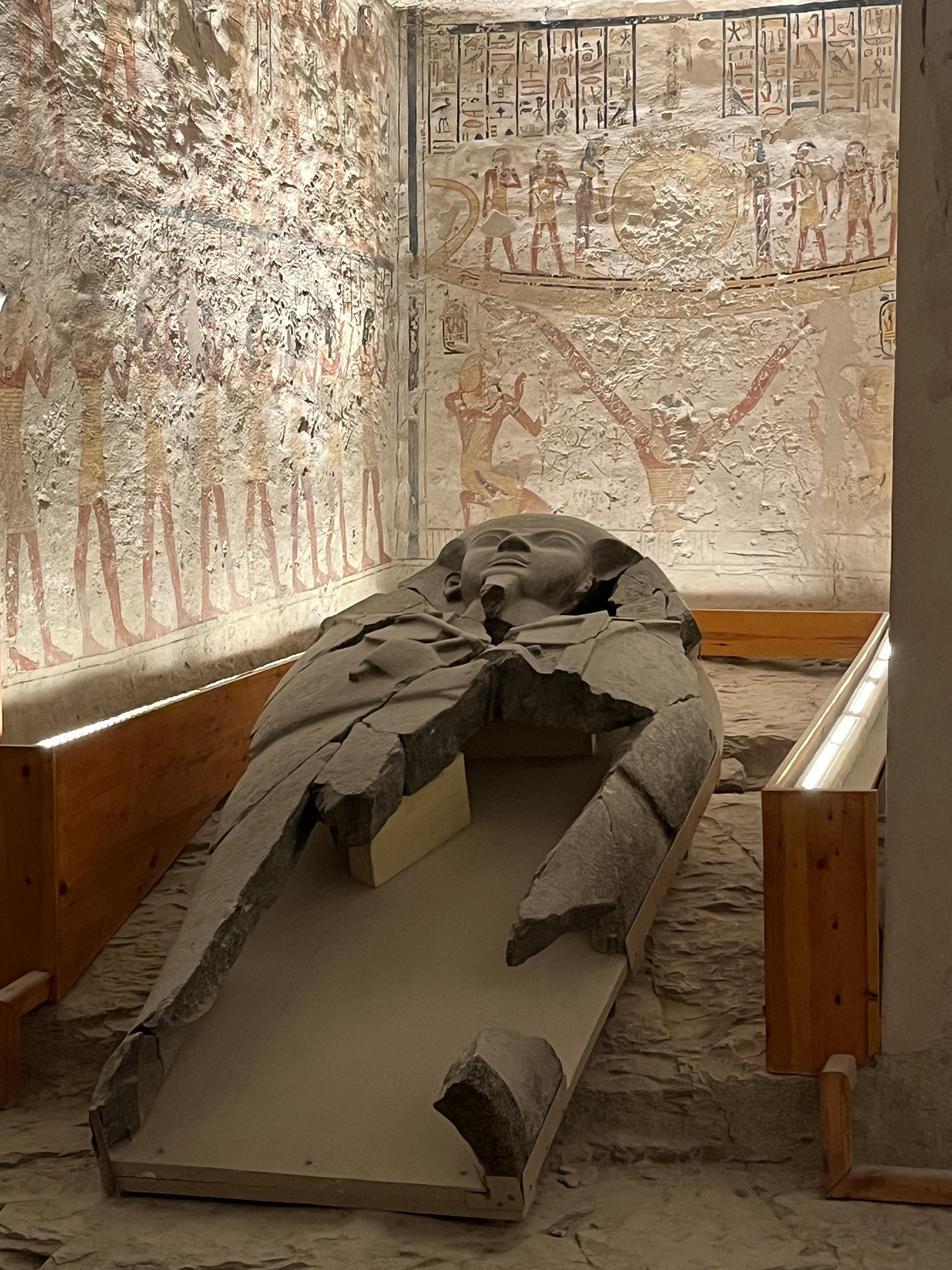
View of the smashed sarcophagus of Ramesses VI in 2023.

Ramesses VI was buried in the Valley of the Kings, in a tomb now known as KV9. The tomb was first built for Ramesses V, who may have been buried in it for the short period of time necessary for another, likely undecorated tomb, to be cut for him somewhere else in the Valley of Kings and which remains to be discovered. In any case, Ramesses VI commanded that KV9 be entirely refurbished for himself with no space left for Ramesses V's permanent burial, who was finally led to rest in Ramesses VI's second year on the throne, possibly because stability had returned to Thebes at the time. The usurpation of Ramesses V's tomb may be a sign that Ramesses VI did not hold his predecessor in high regard, which would explain why he had Ramesses V's name obliterated and replaced by his own on more than one occasion. Alternatively it may reflect the king's pragmatic concern for economical measures. The renewed works on KV9 are responsible for the preservation of the tomb of Tutankhamun, the entrance of which was buried beneath huts built for the craftsmen working on Ramesses VI's tomb. These works seem to have been completed during Ramesses VI's sixth year of reign, at which point Ramessesnakht received 600 debens of blunted copper tools in the great forecourt of Amun in Karnak, probably indicating the end of the construction works on the tomb. Furthermore, if the Theban ostracon 1860a does refer to Ramesses VI and not Ramesses X, then it indicates that the tomb was finally ready for the king in his eighth year on the throne, at which point he might have been ill and nearing death. Once finished, the tomb was 104 m (341 ft)-long and included one of only three complete renditions of the Book of Gates known from royal funerary context, (Note: The other renditions are found in the tomb of Seti I and in the Osireion.) as well as a complete version of the Book of Caverns.

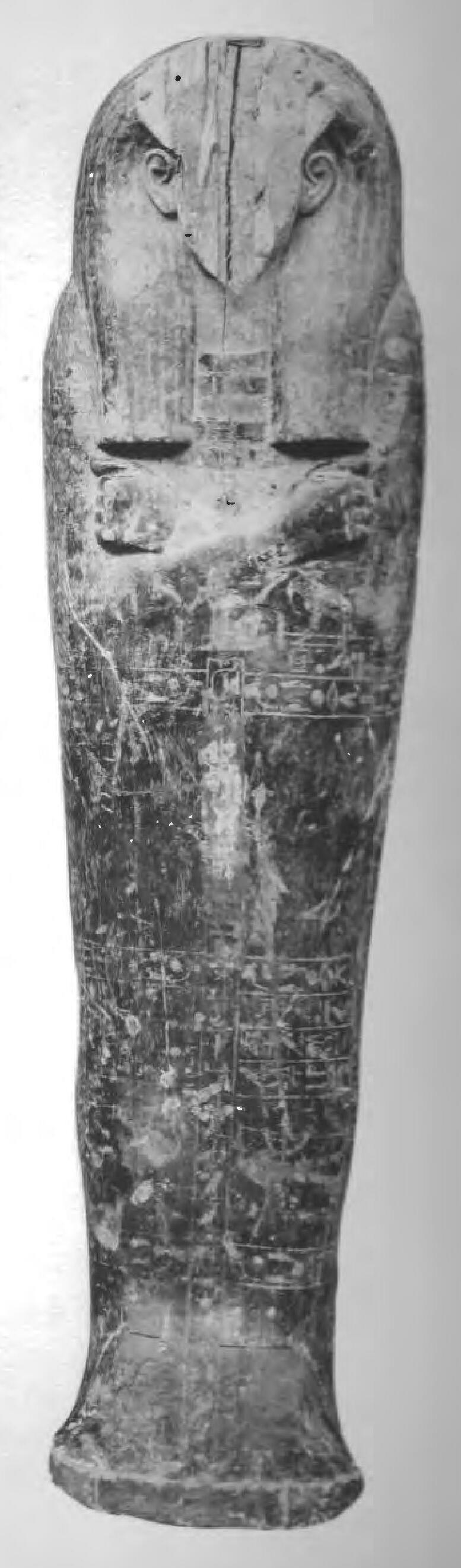
Coffin of Ramesses VI

Within 20 years of Ramesses VI's burial, the tomb was most probably desecrated and ransacked by grave robbers, who hacked away at the hands and feet of Ramesses' mummy to gain access to his jewelry. These events, occurring during the reign of Ramesses XI, are described in the Papyrus Mayer B although the identification of the tomb mentioned in this source is not entirely certain. Ramesses VI's mummy was subsequently moved to the tomb KV35 of Amenhotep II during the reign of Pinedjem of the early Twenty-First Dynasty, where it was discovered in 1898 by Victor Loret. A medical examination of the mummy revealed that Ramesses VI died aged around forty, and showed severe damage to his body, the head and torso being broken into several pieces by an axe used by the tomb robbers. An isolated female hand was found within the mummy's wrappings.

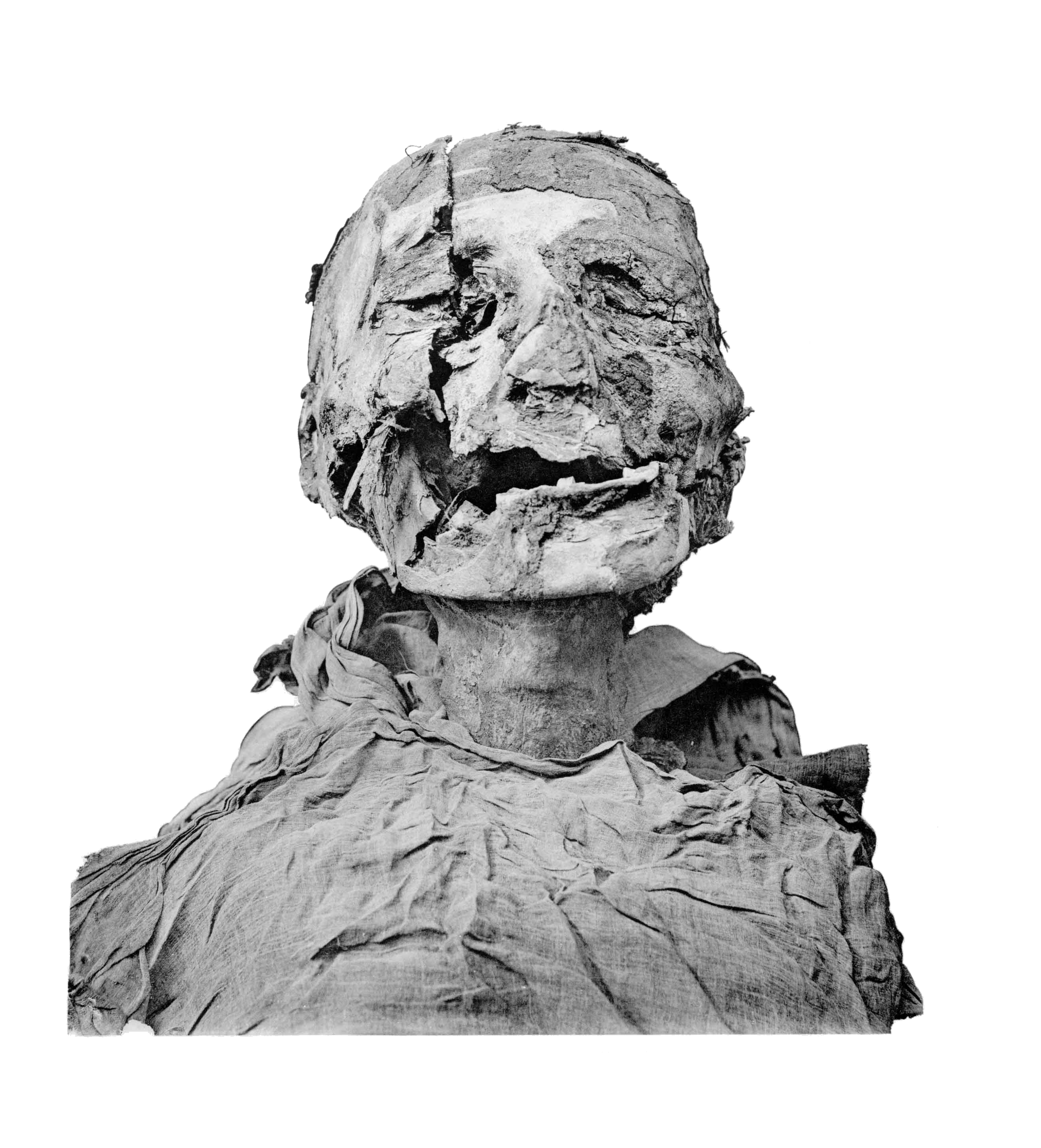
Ramesses VI's mummy was damaged by grave robbers.

In 1898, Georges Émile Jules Daressy cleared KV9, which had remained opened since antiquity, uncovering fragments of a large granite box as well as numerous pieces of Ramesses VI's mummiform stone sarcophagus, the face of which is now in the British Museum. The sarcophagus was restored in 2004 following two years of work on over 250 fragments recovered in the tomb, where it is now on display. Zahi Hawass, then head of Egypt's Supreme Council of Antiquities, unsuccessfully requested the return of the sarcophagus' face from the British Museum to Egypt.

In 2020, the Egyptian Tourism Authority released a full 3D model of the tomb with detailed photographies, available online.

In April 2021 his mummy was moved from the Egyptian Museum to the National Museum of Egyptian Civilization along with those of 17 other kings and 4 queens in an event termed the Pharaohs' Golden Parade.

=== Mortuary temple ===
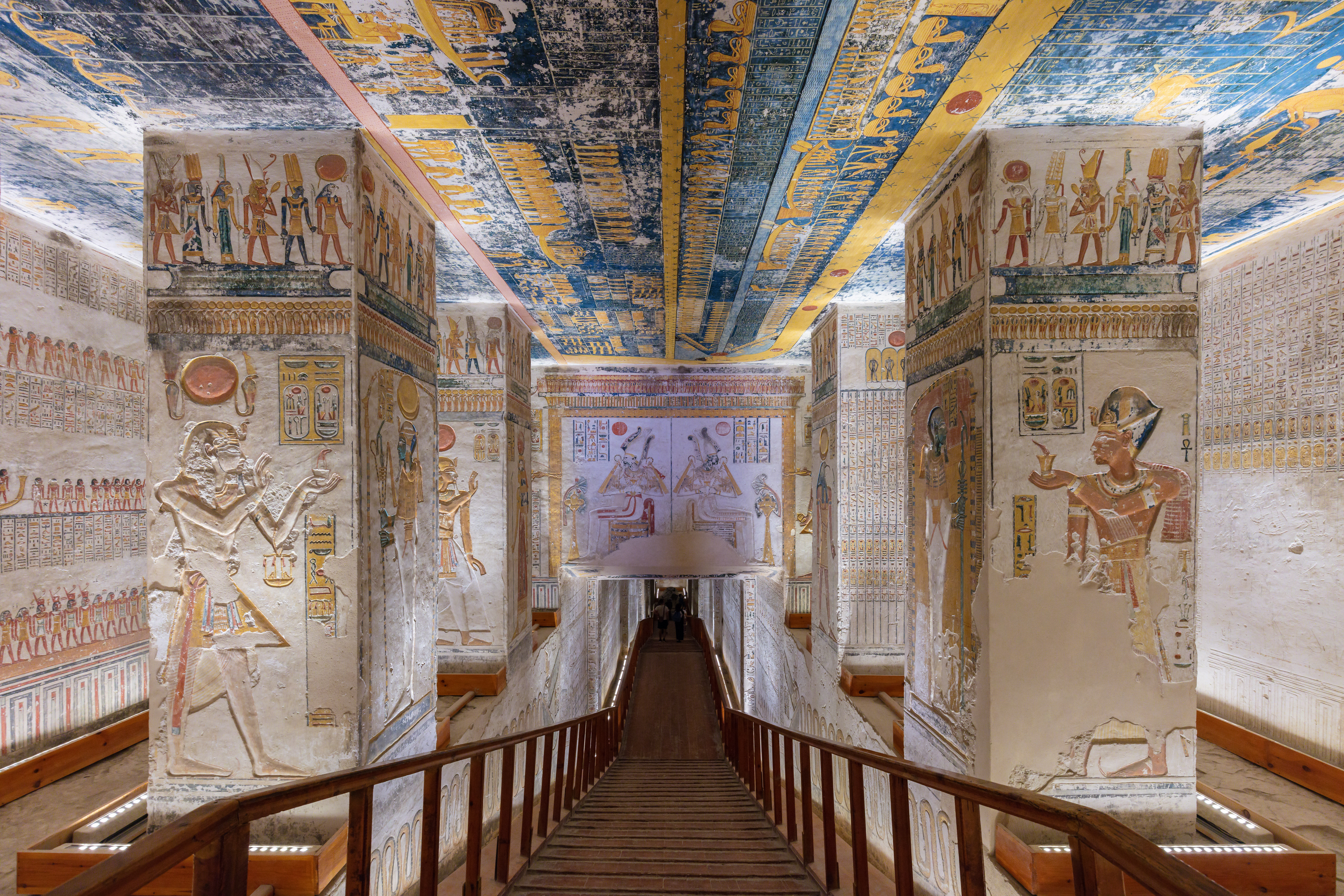
Ramesses VI was originally buried in KV9 in the Valley of the Kings.

Ramesses VI seems to have usurped the large mortuary temple in El-Assasif from Ramesses V, who had himself likely taken it from his father Ramesses IV. The temple was planned to be nearly half the size of that of Medinet Habu and was only in its foundation stages at the death of Ramesses IV. It is unclear whether it was ever completed, but the temple is mentioned as a land-owning institution in the Wilbour Papyrus dating to Ramesses V's reign. Archaeological excavations show much of its surviving decoration was made under Ramesses VI. (Note: That most of the decorations of the temple that have survived to this day were made under Ramesses VI is shown by the presence of his cartouches on these decorations.)

== Notes and references ==
=== Sources ===
- Amer, Amin A. M. A. (1985). "Reflections on the reign of Ramesses VI". The Journal of Egyptian Archaeology. 71: 66–70. doi:10.1177/030751338507100107. JSTOR 3821712. S2CID 192366293.
- Bács, Tamás A. (1995). "A Note on the Divine Adoratrix Isis, daughter of Ramesses VI". Göttinger Miszellen. 148: 7–11.
- Bell, Lanny David (1980). "Only one High Priest Ramessenakht and the second prophet Nesamun his younger son". Serapis. 6: 7–16.
- Bianchi, Robert Steven (2004). Daily life of the Nubians. Greenwood Press "Daily life through history" series. Westport, Conn.: Greenwood Press. ISBN 978-0-31-332501-4.
- Bierbrier, M.L. (1972). "A Second High Priest Ramessesnakht?". The Journal of Egyptian Archaeology. 58: 195–199. doi:10.1177/030751337205800116. JSTOR 3856249. S2CID 192201518.
- Brand, Peter (2010). "Usurpation of Monuments". In Grajetzki, Wolfram; Wendrich, Willeke (eds.). UCLA Encyclopedia of Egyptology. Los Angeles: University of California Los Angeles.
- Breasted, James Henry (1948). Bronze base of a statue of Ramses VI discovered at Megiddo. Chicago: University of Chicago Press. OCLC 83774290.
- Brescinani, Edda; Donadoni, Sergio; Guidotti, Maria-Cristina; Leospo, Enrichetta; Leclant, Jean (1993). L'Egypte antique illustrée de Champollion et Rosellini (in French). Paris: Citadelles Mazenod.
- Brock, Edwin C. (1999). "Funerary texts". In Bard, Kathryn; Shubert, Stephen Blake (eds.). Encyclopedia of the archaeology of ancient Egypt. London; New York: Routledge. pp. 382–385. ISBN 978-0-203-98283-9.
- Brugsch, Heinrich Karl (1859). Histoire d'Égypte dès les premiers temps de son existence jusqu'à nos jours (in French). Leipzig: J. C. Hinrichs. OCLC 23425377.
- Burke, Aaron A.; Peilstöcker, Martin; Karoll, Amy; Pierce, George A.; Kowalski, Krister; Ben-Marzouk, Nadia; Damm, Jacob C.; Danielson, Andrew J.; Fessler, Heidi D.; Kaufman, Brett; Pierce, Krystal V.L.; Höflmayer, Felix; Damiata, Brian N.; Dee, Michael (2017). "Excavations of the New Kingdom Fortress in Jaffa, 2011–2014: Traces of Resistance to Egyptian Rule in Canaan" (PDF). American Journal of Archaeology. 121 (1): 85–133. doi:10.3764/aja.121.1.0085. JSTOR 10.3764/aja.121.1.0085. S2CID 193757757.
- Černý, Jaroslav (1975). "Egypt: from the death of Ramesses III to the end of the Twenty-First Dynasty". In Edwards, Iorwerth Eiddon Stephen; Gadd, Cyril John; Hammond, Nicholas Geoffrey Lemprière; Sollberger, E. (eds.). The Cambridge Ancient History II part 2. The Middle East and the Aegean Region c. 1380–1000 B.C. (3rd ed.). Cambridge: Cambridge university press. pp. 606–657. ISBN 978-0-52-108691-2.
- Clayton, Peter (1994). Chronicle of the Pharaohs. London: Thames & Hudson. ISBN 978-0-500-05074-3.
- Cohen, Susan (2016). "History of Egypt in Palestine". In Grajetzki, Wolfram; Wendrich, Willeke (eds.). UCLA Encyclopedia of Egyptology. Los Angeles: University of California Los Angeles.
- Collier, Mark; Dodson, Aidan; Hamernik, Gottfried (2010). "P. BM 10052, Anthony Harris and Queen Tyti". Journal of Egyptian Archaeology. 96: 242–247. doi:10.1177/030751331009600119. S2CID 161861581.
- Demas, Martha; Neville, Agnew, eds. (2016a). Valley of the Queens Assessment Report: A Collaborative Project of the Getty Conservation Institute and the Supreme Council of Antiquities, Egypt. Vol. 1, Conservation and Management Planning. Los Angeles: Getty Conservation Institute. hdl:10020/gci_pubs/valley_queens. ISBN 978-1-93-743336-9.
- Demas, Martha; Neville, Agnew, eds. (2016b). Valley of the Queens Assessment Report: A Collaborative Project of the Getty Conservation Institute and the Supreme Council of Antiquities, Egypt. Vol. 2, Assessment of 18th, 19th, and 20th Dynasty Tombs. Los Angeles: Getty Conservation Institute. hdl:10020/gci_pubs/valley_queens. ISBN 978-1-93-743336-9.
- Dodson, Aidan (1999). "Tutankhamen, tomb of". In Bard, Kathryn; Shubert, Stephen Blake (eds.). Encyclopedia of the archaeology of ancient Egypt. London; New York: Routledge. pp. 1044–1048. ISBN 978-0-203-98283-9.
- Dodson, Aidan; Hilton, Dyan (2004). The Complete Royal Families of Ancient Egypt. London: Thames & Hudson Ltd. ISBN 978-0-500-05128-3.
- de Morgan, Jacques (1893). Catalogue des monuments et inscriptions de l'Égypte antique / Sér. 1, Haute Égypte. 1, De la frontière de la Nubie à Kom Ombos. Leipzig: Direction Générale du Service des Antiquités. OCLC 312439542.
- Grandet, Pierre (2014). "Early to Mid-20th Dynasty". In Grajetzki, Wolfram; Wendrich, Willeke (eds.). UCLA Encyclopedia of Egyptology. Los Angeles: University of California Los Angeles.
- Grimal, Nicolas (1992). A History of Ancient Egypt. Translated by Ian Shaw. Hoboken, New Jersey: Wiley-Blackwell publishing. ISBN 978-0-631-19396-8.
- Harris, James E; Wente, Edward Frank (1980). An x-ray atlas of the royal mummies. Chicago: University of Chicago Press. OCLC 9399981.
- Hayes, William (1978). The Scepter of Egypt: A Background for the Study of the Egyptian Antiquities in The Metropolitan Museum of Art. Vol. 2, The Hyksos Period and the New Kingdom (1675–1080 B.C.). New York: Metropolitan Museum of Art. OCLC 7427345.
- Hornung, Erik; Krauss, Rolf; Warburton, David, eds. (2012). Ancient Egyptian Chronology. Handbook of Oriental Studies. Leiden, Boston: Brill. ISBN 978-90-04-11385-5. ISSN 0169-9423.
- Hovestreydt, Willem (1997). "A Letter to the King Relating to the Foundation of a Statue (P. Turin 1879 vso.)". Lingua Aegyptia. 5. Hamburg: Widmaier Verlag: 107–121.
- Janssen, Jac J. (1975). Commodity prices from the Ramessid period : an economic study of the village of Necropolis workmen at Thebes. Leiden: E. J. Brill. ISBN 978-9-00-404211-7..
- Janssen, Jac J. (1978). "Year 8 of Ramesses VI Attested". Göttinger Miszellen. 29.
- Janssen, Jac J. (1997). Village varia. Ten studies on the history and administration of Deir el-Medina. Egyptologische uitgaven. Vol. 11. Leiden: Nederlands Inst. voor het Nabije Oosten. ISBN 978-9-06-258211-2.
- Kitchen, Kenneth Anderson (1972). "Ramesses VII and the Twentieth Dynasty". The Journal of Egyptian Archaeology. 58: 182–194. doi:10.1177/030751337205800115. JSTOR 3856248. S2CID 192401651.
- Kitchen, Kenneth Anderson (1982). "The Twentieth Dynasty Revisited". The Journal of Egyptian Archaeology. 68: 116–125. doi:10.1177/030751338206800116. JSTOR 3821630. S2CID 192257695.
- Kitchen, Kenneth Anderson (1983). Ramesside inscriptions : historical and biographical. Vol. VI. [Ramesses IV to XI and Contemporaries]. Oxford: B.H. Blackwell. OCLC 866782570.
- Leblanc, Christian (1999). "Thebes, Valley of the Queens". In Bard, Kathryn; Shubert, Stephen Blake (eds.). Encyclopedia of the archaeology of ancient Egypt. London; New York: Routledge. pp. 1020–1023. ISBN 978-0-203-98283-9.
- Legrain, Georges (1909). Catalogue Général des antiquités égyptiennes du musée du Caire. Nos : 42192-42250. Statues et statuettes de rois et de particuliers. Tome second (PDF) (in French). Le Caire: Institut français d'archéologie orientale. OCLC 729119833. Archived from the original (PDF) on 2013-05-13.
- Leprohon, Ronald J. (2013). The great name: ancient Egyptian royal titulary. Writings from the ancient world, no. 33. Atlanta: Society of Biblical Literature. ISBN 978-1-58983-736-2.
- Lobban, Richard Andrew Jr. (2004). Historical dictionary of ancient and medieval Nubia. Historical dictionaries of ancient civilizations and historical eras. Vol. 10. Lanham, Md.: Scarecrow Press. ISBN 978-0-81-084784-2.
- Loret, Victor (1899). "Le tombeau d'Aménophis II et la cachette royale de Biban el-Molouk". Bulletin de l'Institut Egyptien (in French). Vol. 3. Le Caire. pp. 98–112. OCLC 469908038.
- Mazar, Amihai (1990). Freedman, D.N. (ed.). Archaeology of the Land of the Bible 10,000–586 BCE. Anchor Bible reference library (1st ed.). New Haven, Conn.; London: Yale University Press. ISBN 978-0-30-014179-5.
- Mumford, G. J. (1999). "Serabit el-Khadim". In Bard, Kathryn; Shubert, Stephen Blake (eds.). Encyclopedia of the archaeology of ancient Egypt. London; New York: Routledge. pp. 881–885. ISBN 978-0-203-98283-9.
- Murnane, William J. (1971). "The "King Ramesses" of the Medinet Habu Procession of Princes". Journal of the American Research Center in Egypt. 9: 121–131. doi:10.2307/40001059. JSTOR 40001059.
- Murnane, William J. (1999). "Thebes, royal funerary temples". In Bard, Kathryn; Shubert, Stephen Blake (eds.). Encyclopedia of the archaeology of ancient Egypt. London; New York: Routledge. pp. 995–1000. ISBN 978-0-203-98283-9.
- Nasrawi, Salah (2004-03-22). "Pharaoh's sarcophagus reassembled at last". NBC News. Archived from the original on 2018-03-28.
- Peden, Alexander (1989). "The usurped stela of Ramesses V". Göttinger Miszellen: Beiträge zur ägyptologischen Diskussion. 110: 41–46.
- Peden, Alexander J. (2001a). The graffiti of Pharaonic Egypt : scope and roles of informal writings (c 3100-332 B.C.). Probleme der Ägyptologie. Vol. 17. Leiden; Boston; Köln: Brill. ISBN 978-9-00-412112-6.
- Peden, Alexander J. (2001b). "Where Did Ramesses VI Bury his Nephew?". Göttinger Miszellen. 181: 83–88. ISSN 0344-385X.
- "Pharaoh Ramses VI Tomb". Egyptian Tourism Authority. 2020-04-15. Archived from the original on 2020-04-20.
- Polz, Daniel (1998). "The Ramsesnakht Dynasty and the Fall of the New Kingdom: A New Monument in Thebes". Studien zur Altägyptischen Kultur. 25. Hamburg: Helmut Buske Verlag GmbH: 257–293. JSTOR 25152764.
- "Ramses VI". Encyclopædia Britannica.
- Rice, Michael (1999). Who is who in Ancient Egypt. London; New York: Routledge. ISBN 978-0-203-44328-6.
- Saleh, Abdel-Aziz (1981). Excavations at Heliopolis Ancient Egyptian Ounû. vol. I, (The Site of Tell el-Hisn-Matarîyah). Cairo: Cairo University Faculty of Archaeology. OCLC 493125900.
- Seele, Keith Cedric (1960). "Ramesses VI and the Medinet Habu Procession of the Princes". Journal of Near Eastern Studies. 19 (3): 184–204. doi:10.1086/371581. JSTOR 543775. S2CID 161400066.
- Shaw, Ian (2000). "Chronology". In Shaw, Ian (ed.). The Oxford History of Ancient Egypt. Oxford: Oxford University Press. pp. 480–489. ISBN 978-0-19-815034-3.
- Ussishkin, David (1995). "The Destruction of Megiddo at the End of the Late Bronze Age and Its Historical Significance". Tel Aviv. 22 (2): 265–307. doi:10.1179/tav.1995.1995.2.240.
- van Dijk, Jacobus (2000). "The Amarna Period and the Later New Kingdom (c.1352–1069 BC)". In Shaw, Ian (ed.). The Oxford History of Ancient Egypt. Oxford: Oxford University Press. pp. 265–489. ISBN 978-0-19-815034-3.
- Ventura, Raphael (1983). "More Chronological Evidence from Turin Papyrus Cat.1907+1908". Journal of Near Eastern Studies. 42 (4). Chicago: The University of Chicago Press: 271–277. doi:10.1086/373033. JSTOR 544539. S2CID 162347962.
- Vinson, Steve (2001). "Ramses VI". In Redford, Donald B. (ed.). The Oxford Encyclopedia of Ancient Egypt, Volume 3. Oxford: Oxford University Press. pp. 120–121. ISBN 978-0-19-510234-5.
- von Beckerath, Jürgen (1971). "Ein Denkmal zur Genealogie der XX. Dynastie". Zeitschrift für Ägyptische Sprache und Altertumskunde (in German). 79 (1): 7–12. ISSN 0044-216X.
- von Beckerath, Jürgen (1984). "Drei Thronbesteigungsdaten der XX. Dynastie". Göttinger Miszellen (in German). 79: 7–10.
- von Beckerath, Jürgen (1999). Handbuch der ägyptischen Königsnamen. Münchner ägyptologische Studien (in German). Vol. 49. Mainz: Philip von Zabern. p. 190. ISBN 978-3-8053-2591-2.
- Weeks, Kent R. (1999). "Thebes, Valley of the Kings". In Bard, Kathryn; Shubert, Stephen Blake (eds.). Encyclopedia of the archaeology of ancient Egypt. London; New York: Routledge. pp. 1013–1018. ISBN 978-0-203-98283-9.
- Wente, Edward Frank; Van Siclen, Charles Cornell III (1977). "A Chronology of the New Kingdom". In Johnson, J. H.; Wente, E. F. (eds.). Studies in Honor of George R. Hughes, January 12, 1977. Studies in Ancient Oriental Civilization (SAOC). Vol. 39. Chicago: The Oriental Institute. pp. 217–262. ISBN 0-918986-01-X.
- Yurco, Frank J. (1999). "Deir el-Medina". In Bard, Kathryn; Shubert, Stephen Blake (eds.). Encyclopedia of the archaeology of ancient Egypt. London; New York: Routledge. pp. 292–295. ISBN 978-0-203-98283-9.

Preceded by Ramesses V	Pharaoh of Egypt; Twentieth Dynasty	Succeeded by Ramesses VII
