= Baketwernel =

Baketwerel
- Great Royal Wife; Queen consort of Egypt
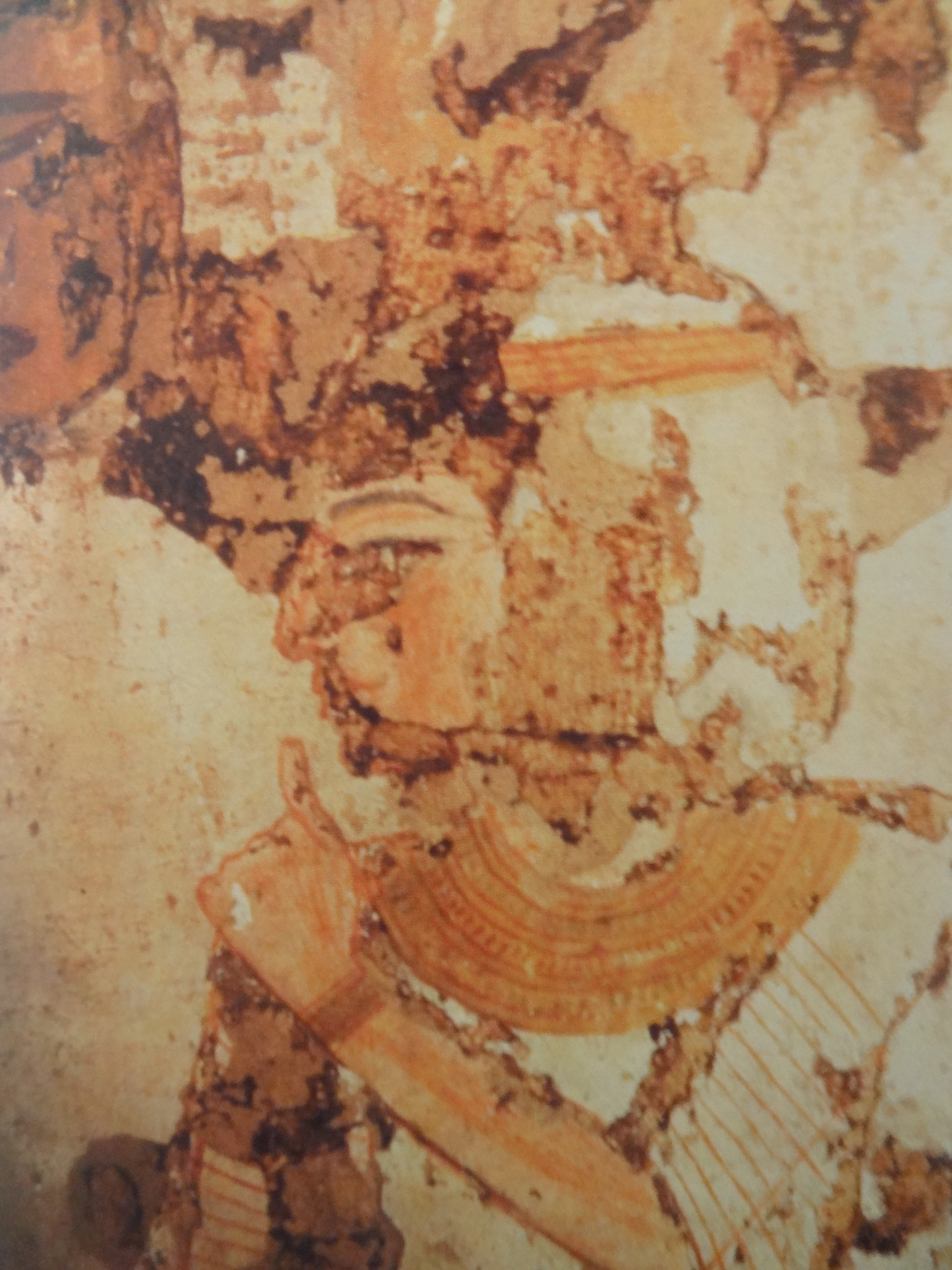
- Depiction of Baketwernel from KV10
- Burial: KV10, Valley of the Kings
- Spouse: Ramesses IX (possibly)
- Dynasty: 20th Dynasty

G29 k t w r n Z2 r Z1
Baketwernel
in hieroglyphs
Era: New Kingdom
(1550–1069 BC)

Baketwernel (also spelled Baketwerel) was an ancient Egyptian queen during the 20th Dynasty. She is likely to have been the Great Royal Wife of Ramesses IX.

== Burial ==
She was buried in the tomb KV10, built for the late 19th Dynasty usurper-pharaoh Amenmesse, where a chamber was redecorated for her use. Because of this fact, she was previously thought to have been Amenmesse's wife.

Dodson (1987) has argued that the redecoration in tomb KV10 was done during the reign of Ramesses IX. Schaden and Ertman (1989) however claim that some of the work in the room for Baketwerel may have been done during the reign of Queen Tausret. If so, this would suggest an earlier date for Queen Baketwernel.
