= Ostracon of Prince Sethherkhepshef =

Egyptian limestone in Turin

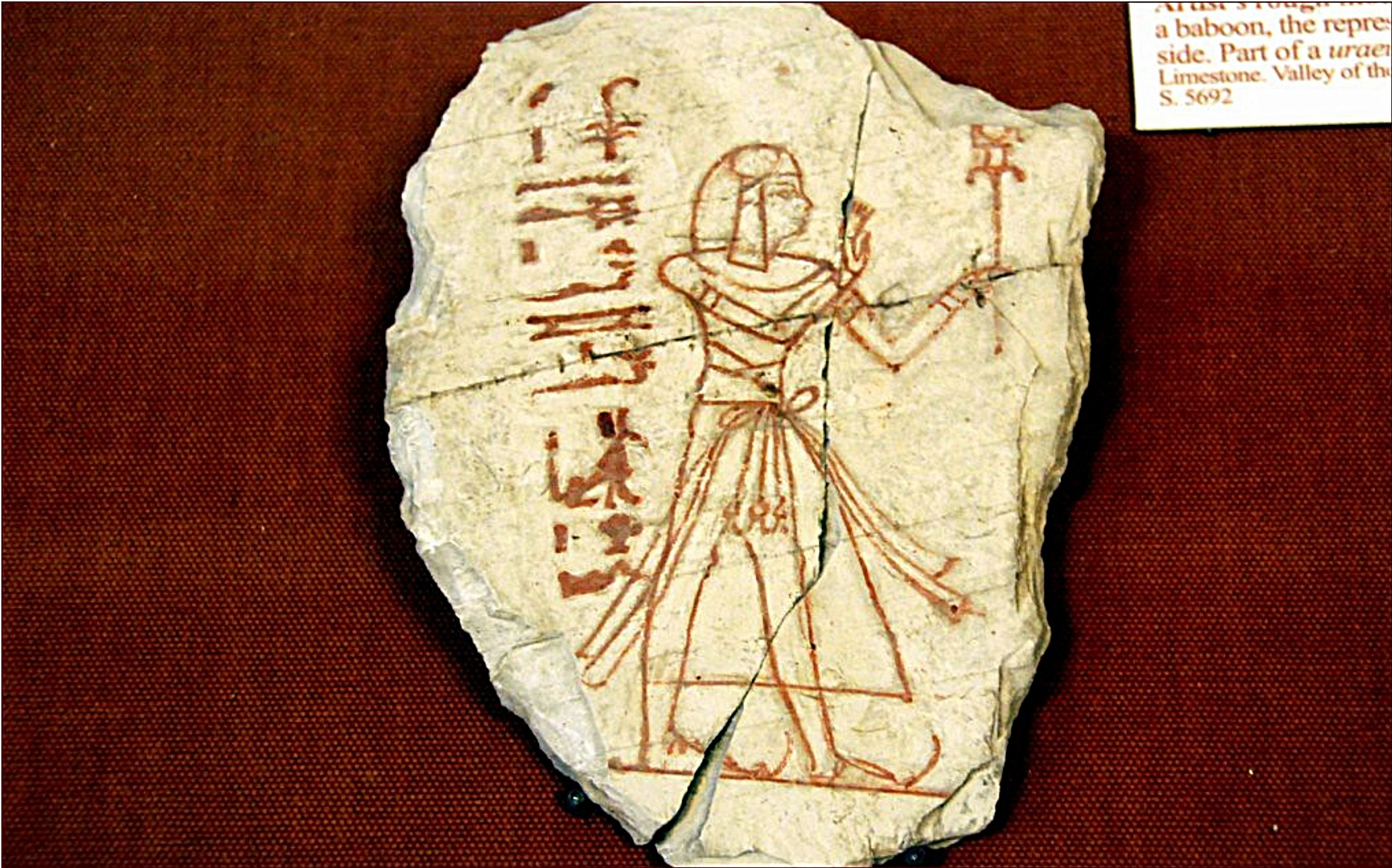
A rare ostracon of Prince Sethherkhepshef, son of Ramesses III. He would later become king as Ramesses VIII.

E20 D2 Z1 F23
Sethherkhepshef
in hieroglyphs
Era: New Kingdom
(1550–1069 BC)

The Ostracon of Prince Sethherkhepshef is a painted limestone figured-ostracon of the son of Ramesses III (reigned 1186–1155 BCE). It is a standing, figured profile of Prince Sethherkhepshef (who later ascended the throne as Ramesses VIII) in an adoration pose, with outstretched arms, a sceptre in his left hand, and right hand, palm-forward. Behind Sethherkhepshef in a standard layout of figures and writing, is a vertical column of hieroglyphs reading "king's son of his body, his beloved" with his name (Seth-her-kepesh) appearing at the end.

The ostracon was discovered in the Valley of the Queens—specifically in tomb QV43, built for the prince during the Twentieth Dynasty of Egypt. The discovery was made during the period of Ottoman Egypt, and the artifact is now housed in the Museo Egizio, Turin, Italy.

Egyptian ostraca were used for artist's sketchings, cartoons-caricatures, letter documents, school–practice writing, and graffiti. This particular ostracon may be a sketch by an artisan working on the prince's tomb.
