= Ramesses VIII =

Egyptian pharaoh

- Also written Ramses and Rameses
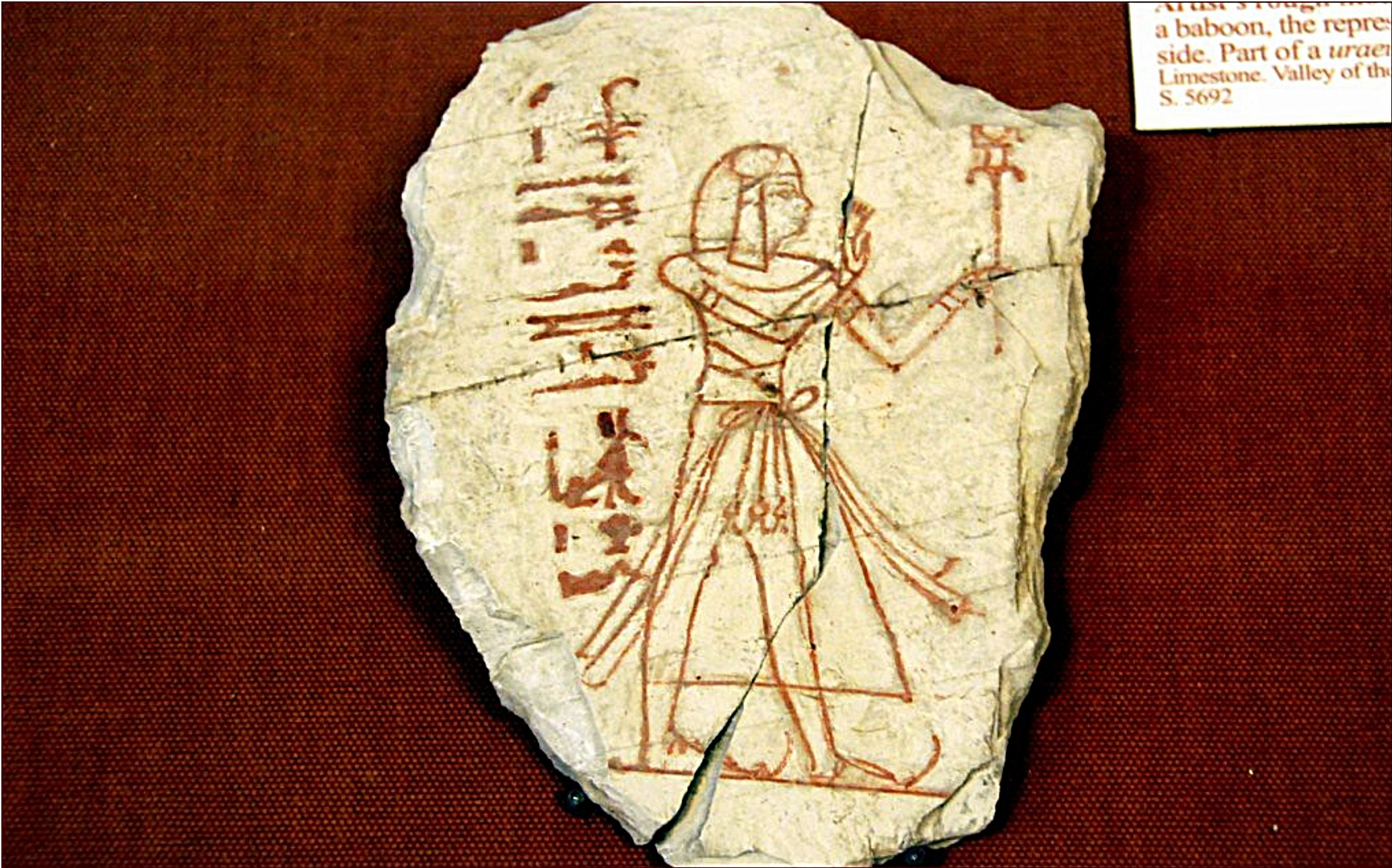
- An ostracon depicting Prince Sethherkhepshef or the future Ramesses VIII in an adoration pose, with outstretched arms, and a scepter in his left hand.

Pharaoh
- Reign: 1-2 regnal year 1129–1128 BC
- Predecessor: Ramesses VII
- Successor: Ramesses IX
Royal titulary
Prenomen
Usermaatre-Akhenamun

M23 X1 L2 X1	ra wsr mAat C12 Ax x n
Nomen
Ramesses (Sethherkhepsef)meryamun

G39 N5	N5 C7 C12 N36 F31 s M23
- Father: Ramesses III
- Mother: unknown
- Died: 1128 BC
- Dynasty: 20th Dynasty

Usermaatre Akhenamun Ramesses VIII (also written Ramses and Rameses) or Ramesses Sethherkhepshef Meryamun ('Set is his Strength, beloved of Amun') (reigned 1129–1128 BC, or 1130 BC), the seventh Pharaoh of the Twentieth Dynasty of the New Kingdom of Egypt. Ramesses VIII is the most obscure ruler of the 20th Dynasty, and the current information from his brief kingship suggests that he lasted on the throne for one year at the most. Even his mother is unknown; he was certainly a son of Ramesses III--but no information is known about his maternity according to the British Egyptologist Aidan Dodson.

== Early life ==
=== Family ===
He was the 9th of the 10 sons of Ramesses III.

=== Prince Setherkhepsef II ===
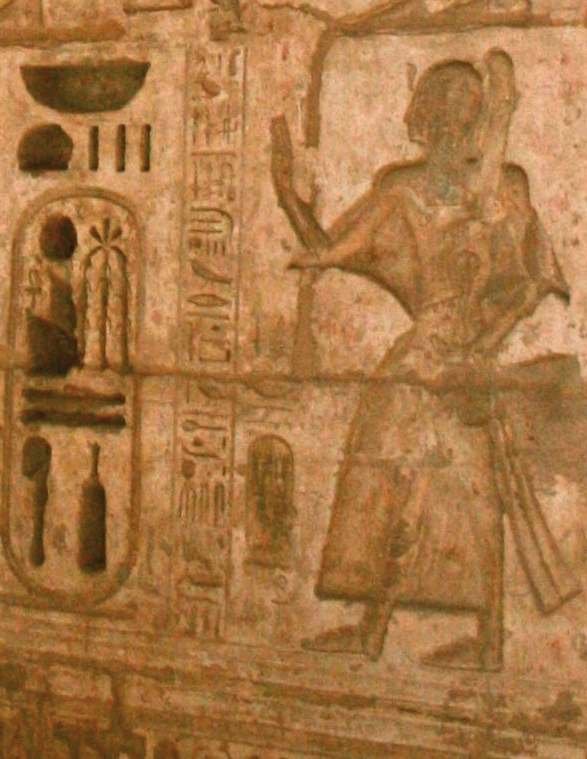
Relief of Prince Sethiherkhepeshef II, one of Ramesses III's many sons, from the latter's temple at Medinet Habu. Sethherkhepeshef II later briefly ascended the throne as king Ramesses VIII.

Before ascending to the throne, he was simply known as Prince Sethherkhepsef II.

== Reign ==
Ramesses VIII's Prenomen, Usermaatre Akhenamun, means "Powerful is the maat of Ra, Effective for Amun."

Monuments from his reign are scarce, and consist primarily of an inscription at Medinet Habu, a mention of this ruler in one document — Berlin stele 2081 of Hori at Abydos — and one scarab.

=== Accession ===
The fact that he succeeded to power after the death of Ramesses VII —his half-nephew and a son of Ramesses VI—may indicate a continuing problem in the royal succession. Similar to Ramesses IV and Ramesses VI, Ramesses VIII was also a son of pharaoh Ramesses III.

=== Year 1 ===
==== Theban Tomb 113 ====
His only known date is a Year 1, I Peret day 2 graffito in the tomb of Kyenebu (Theban Tomb 113) at Thebes. According to Erik Hornung in a 2006 book, the accession date of Ramesses VIII has been established by Amin Amer in a 1981 article to date to an eight-month interval between I Peret day 2 and I Season of the Inundation day 13.

The tomb inscription notes that it took 3½ months, from Year 1, I Akhet day 13 of Ramesses VIII, to start work and paint scenes on a tomb chapel in Kyenebu's tomb, and up until Year 1, I Peret day 2 to complete the work. Since no year change occurs in this time interval, the accession date for Ramesses VIII must fall outside this period of this text, "i.e., within I Peret 3 to I Akhet 12."

== Death ==
=== Tomb before kingship ===
Before he became Pharaoh, the tomb QV43 in the Valley of the Queens was constructed for him, however, the tomb was never used.

=== Tomb ===
He is the sole pharaoh of the Twentieth Dynasty whose tomb has not been definitely identified in the Valley of the Kings, though some scholars have suggested that the tomb of Prince Mentuherkhepshef, KV19, the son of Ramesses IX, was originally started for Ramesses VIII but proved unsuitable when he became a king in his own right. An all-Egyptian team of researchers headed by Afifi Rohiem under the supervision of Dr. Zahi Hawass were looking for the pharaoh's tomb. Work on the tomb of Ramesses VIII might have started before he ascended the throne, when he was known as prince Sethherkhepshef, as suggested by an ostracon discovered in the Valley of the Queens.

Preceded by Ramesses VII	Pharaoh of Egypt; Twentieth Dynasty	Succeeded by Ramesses IX
