= KV10 =

Ancient Egyptian tomb of Takhat and Baketwernel

- Burial site of Amenmesse
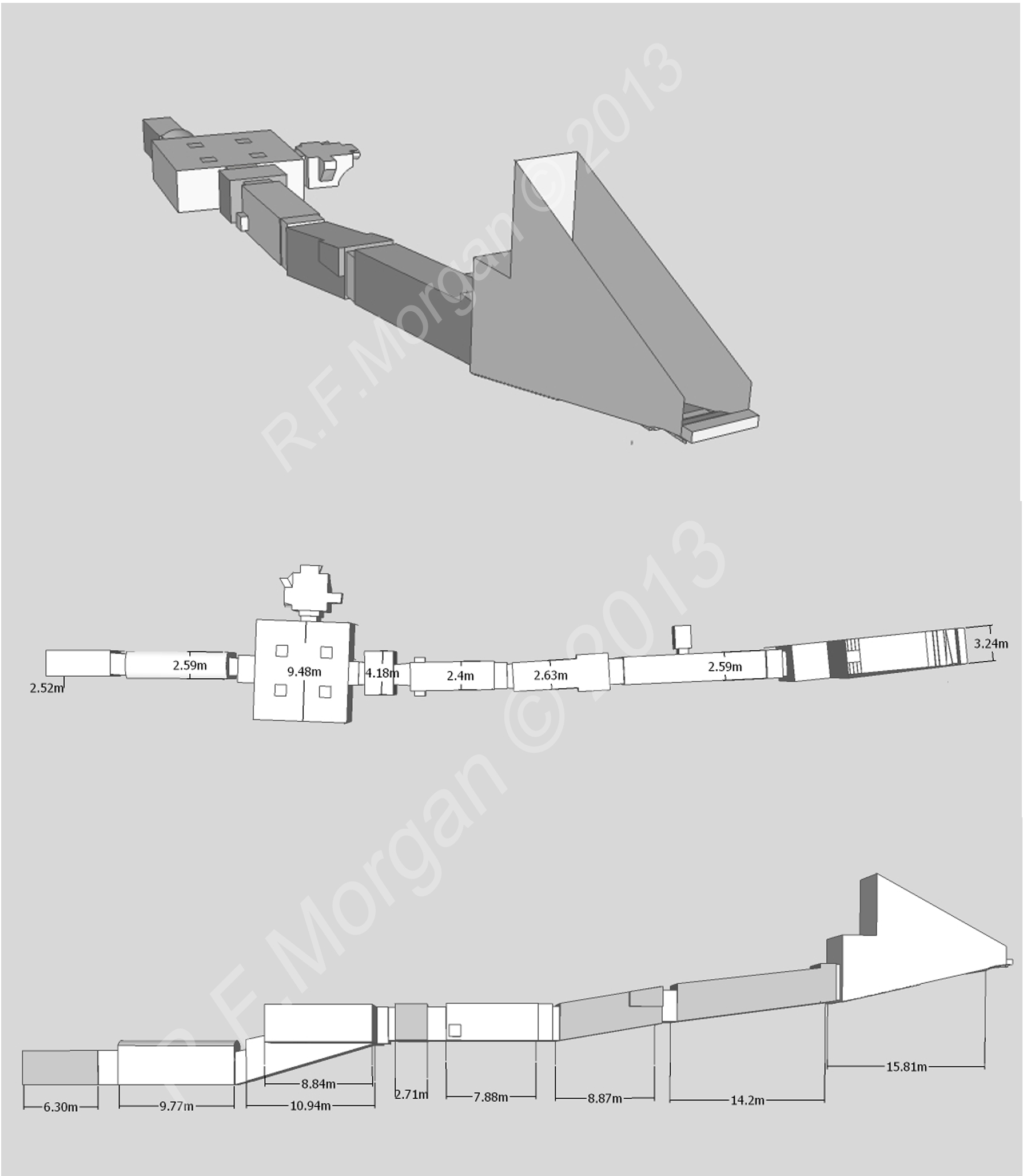
- KV10 schematic

- Location within Egypt
- Coordinates: 25°44′23.7″N 32°36′04.7″E
- Location: East Valley of the Kings
- Discovered: Open in antiquity
- Excavated by: Edward R. Ayrton; Otto Schaden (1992)
- Layout: Straight axis
- ← Previous; KV9 Next → KV11

Tomb KV10, located in the Valley of the Kings near the modern-day Egyptian city of Luxor, was cut and decorated for the burial of Pharaoh Amenmesse of the Nineteenth Dynasty of Ancient Egypt. However, there is no proof that he was actually buried here. Later, the decoration was replaced with scenes for Takhat and Baketwernel—two royal women dating to the late 20th Dynasty.

It was visited by Richard Pococke, Jean-François Champollion and Karl Richard Lepsius, and briefly studied by Edward R. Ayrton before being properly examined by a team from the University of Memphis in the United States under Otto Schaden in 1992.
