= Takhat (20th dynasty) =

- Burial: A chamber in KV10, Valley of the Kings
- Spouse: possibly Montuherkhepeshef
- Issue: Ramesses IX
- Dynasty: 20th Dynasty

t&A N28 t B7
Takhat
in hieroglyphs
Era: New Kingdom
(1550–1069 BC)

Takhat was an ancient Egyptian woman, mother of pharaoh Ramesses IX of the 20th Dynasty.

It is likely that she was the wife of Montuherkhepeshef, a son of Ramesses III.

A chamber of Amenmesse's tomb KV10 was probably usurped and redecorated for her. Parts of a mummy thought to be hers were found.
