= Ramesses VII =

Ancient Egyptian sixth pharaoh of the 20th dynasty

- Ramses VII, Rameses VII
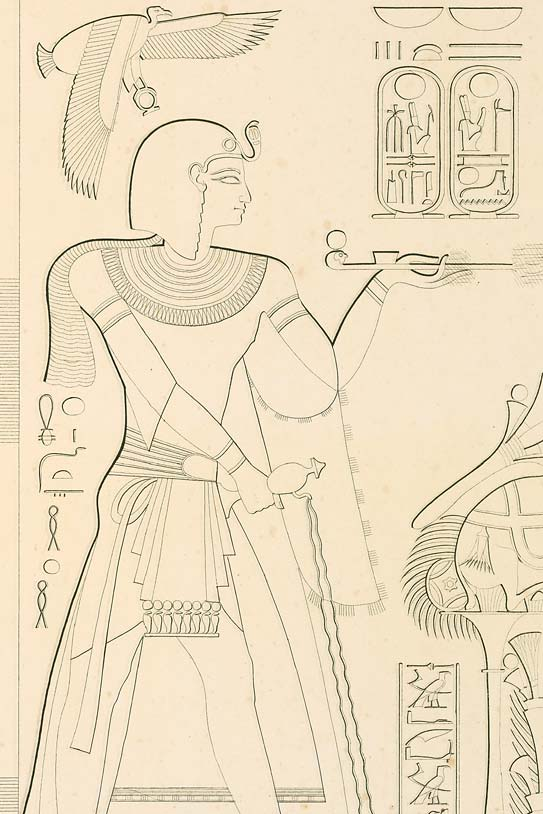
- Ramesses VII from tomb KV1, drawn by Karl Richard Lepsius

Pharaoh
- Reign: 8 regnal years c. 1136–1129 BC
- Predecessor: Ramesses VI
- Successor: Ramesses VIII
Royal titulary
Horus name
Kanakht Anemnesu
K3-nḫt-ˁn-m-ns.w
Strong bull, magnificent of royalty
G5	E2 D40 D36 N35 D6 G17 M23 A42
Nebty name
Mekkemet Wafkhastiu
Mk-Kmt-wˁf-ḫ3st.jw
Protector of Egypt, he who vainquishes the foreigners
G16	G17 D36 V31 Y1 I6 X1 O49 G43 D36 I9 V1 Y1V A24 N25 X1 Z1 T14 A1 B1 Z3 N25
Golden Horus
Userrenput-mi-Amum
Wsr-rnp.wt-mj-Jtm
The golden falcon, rich in years like Atum
G8	F12 M4 M4 M4 W19 C12
Prenomen
Usermaatre Setepenre Meriamun
Wsr-m3ˁ.t-Rˁ-stp-n-Rˁ-mr.j-Jmn
Rich in Maat like Ra, the chosen one of Ra, beloved of Amun
M23 t L2 t < N5 F12 C12 N5 U21 N35 U6 >
Nomen
Ramesisu Itiamun Netjerheqaiunu
Rˁ-msj-sw-jt.j-Jmn-nṯr-ḥq3-Jwnw
Ra has fashioned him, his father is Amun, god of Heliopolis

G39 N5	N5 C12 F31 O34 O34 M17 X1 R8 S38 O28
- Children: Ramesses
- Father: Ramesses VI
- Mother: Nubkhesbed
- Born: c. 12th century BC
- Died: 1129 BC
- Burial: KV1
- Dynasty: 20th Dynasty

Usermaatre Setepenre Meryamun Ramesses VII (also written Ramses and Rameses) was the sixth pharaoh of the 20th Dynasty of Ancient Egypt. He reigned from about 1136 to 1129 BC and was the son of Ramesses VI. Other dates for his reign are 1138–1131 BC.

== Reign ==
Very little is known about his reign, though it was evidently a period of some turmoil, as grain prices soared. Years 1, 2, 4, 5, 6 and 7 of his reign are attested by papyri documents according to a 1976 compilation of known Ramesside dates found on ostraca, papyri, graffiti and Egyptian monuments done by the American Egyptologists Edward F. Wente and Charles Van Sicclen III A gap appears only in his Year 3 but nevertheless Ramesses VII is a rather poorly known ruler. The French Egyptologist Nicolas Grimal notes in his 1988 book titled "A History of Ancient Egypt" that Ramesses VII "left his name at only a small number of sites: Tell el-Yahudiya [or Leontopolis], Memphis, Karnak and Elkab."

=== Year 7 ===
Ostraca O. Strasbourg h 84 is dated to Year 7, II Shemu day 16.

The Turin Accounting Papyrus 1907+1908 is dated to Year 7 III Shemu day 26, and was reconstructed to show that 11 full years passed from Year 5 of Ramesses VI to Year 7 of Ramesses VII.

=== Year 8 ===
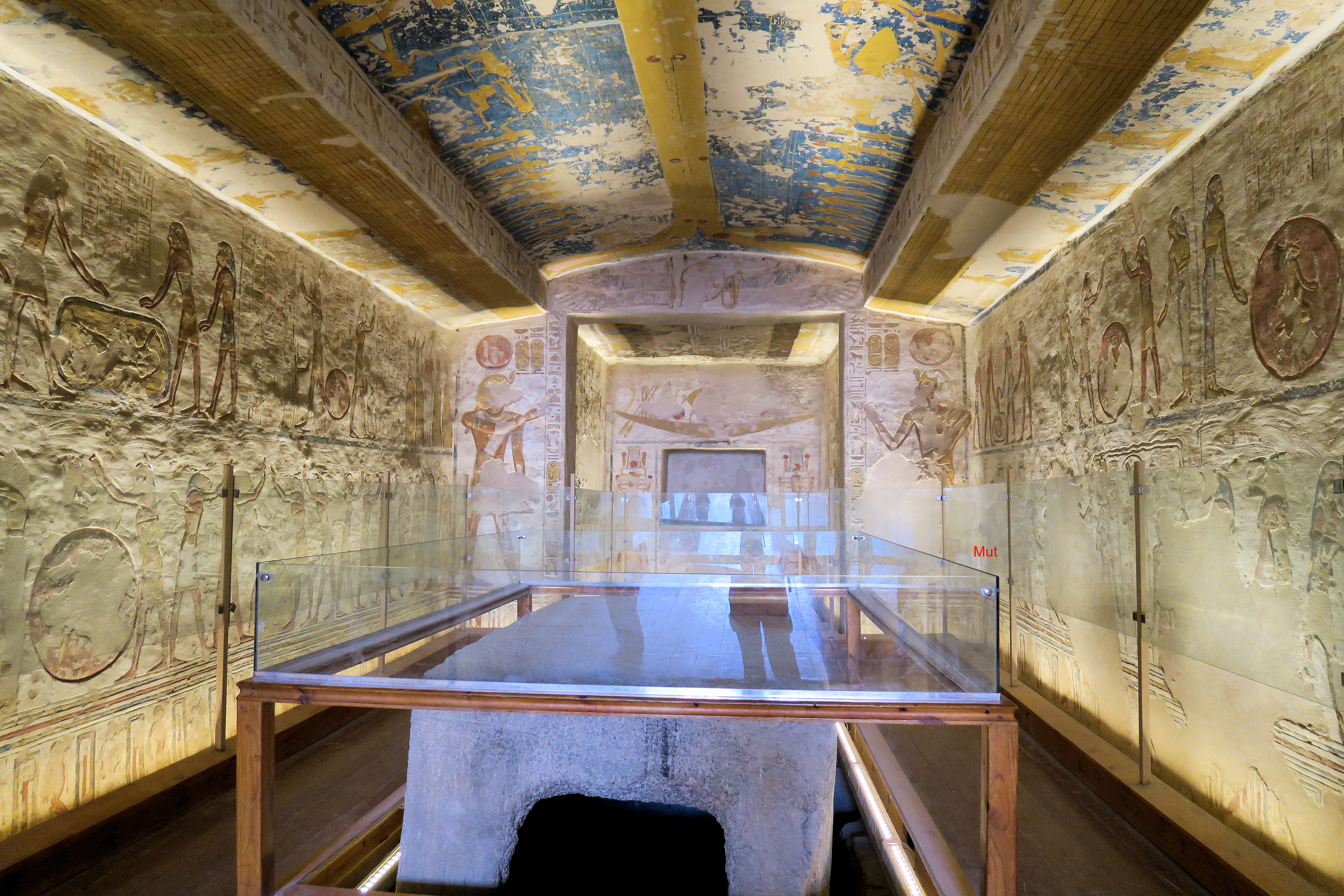
Sarcophagus and Tomb of Ramesses VII's KV1 tomb

C.J. Eyre (1980) demonstrated that Papyrus Turin Cat. 1883 + 2095, dated to Year 8 IV Shemu day 25 most likely belonged to Ramesses VII, which details the record of the commissioning of some copper work and mentions two foremen at Deir El-Medina: Nekhemmut and Hor[mose]. The foreman Hormose was previously attested in office only during the reign of Ramesses IX while his father and predecessor in this post—a certain Ankherkhau—served in office from the second decade of the reign of Ramesses III through to Year 4 of Ramesses VII, where he is shown acting with Nekhemmut and the scribe Horisheri. The new Year 8 papyrus proves that Hormose succeeded to his father's office as foreman by Year 8 of Ramesses VII. Dominique Valbelle regards C.J. Eyre's attribution of this document to Ramesses VII as uncertain since the chief workman Hormose was previously only securely attested in office in Years 6 and 7 of Ramesses IX instead. However, this papyrus clearly bears the cartouche of Usermaatre Setepenre—the prenomen of Ramesses VII—at its beginning whereas the royal name of Ramesses IX was Neferkare—which rules out Ramesses IX as the king whose Year 8 is recorded in the P. Turin 1883 + 2095 document. The presence of Hormose's contemporary—the foreman Nekhemmut—also establishes that this papyrus dates to the mid-20th dynasty--most probably to the reign of Ramesses VII, since Nekhemmut is attested in office "from the second year of Ramesses IV until the seventeenth year of Ramesses IX."

=== Reign length ===
Since Ramesses VII's accession is known to have occurred around the end of III Peret, the king would have ruled Egypt for a minimum period of 7 years and 5 months when this document was drawn up provided that it belonged to his reign as seems probable from the royal name given in the papyrus. The respected German Egyptologist Jürgen von Beckerath also accepts C.J. Eyre's evidence that Year 8 IV Shemu day 25 was Ramesses VII's highest known date. However, the accession date of his successor, Ramesses VIII, has been fixed by Amin Amer to an 8-month period between I Peret day 2 and I Akhet day 13, or a minimum period of 5 months after the Year 8 IV Shemu day 25 date of Ramesses VII (if the latter actually died in I Peret). Therefore, if Ramesses VII did not die between the short 2 week period between IV Shemu day 29 to I Akhet 13, this pharaoh would have been on the throne for at least another 4 more months until I Peret day 2 and ruled Egypt for 7 years and 9 months when he died (perhaps slightly longer if he died after I Peret day 2). Therefore, it is possible that Ramesses VII could have ruled Egypt for almost 8 years; at present, his certain reign length is 7 years and 5 months.

== Death ==
=== Tomb ===
Ramesses VII was buried in Tomb KV1 upon his death.

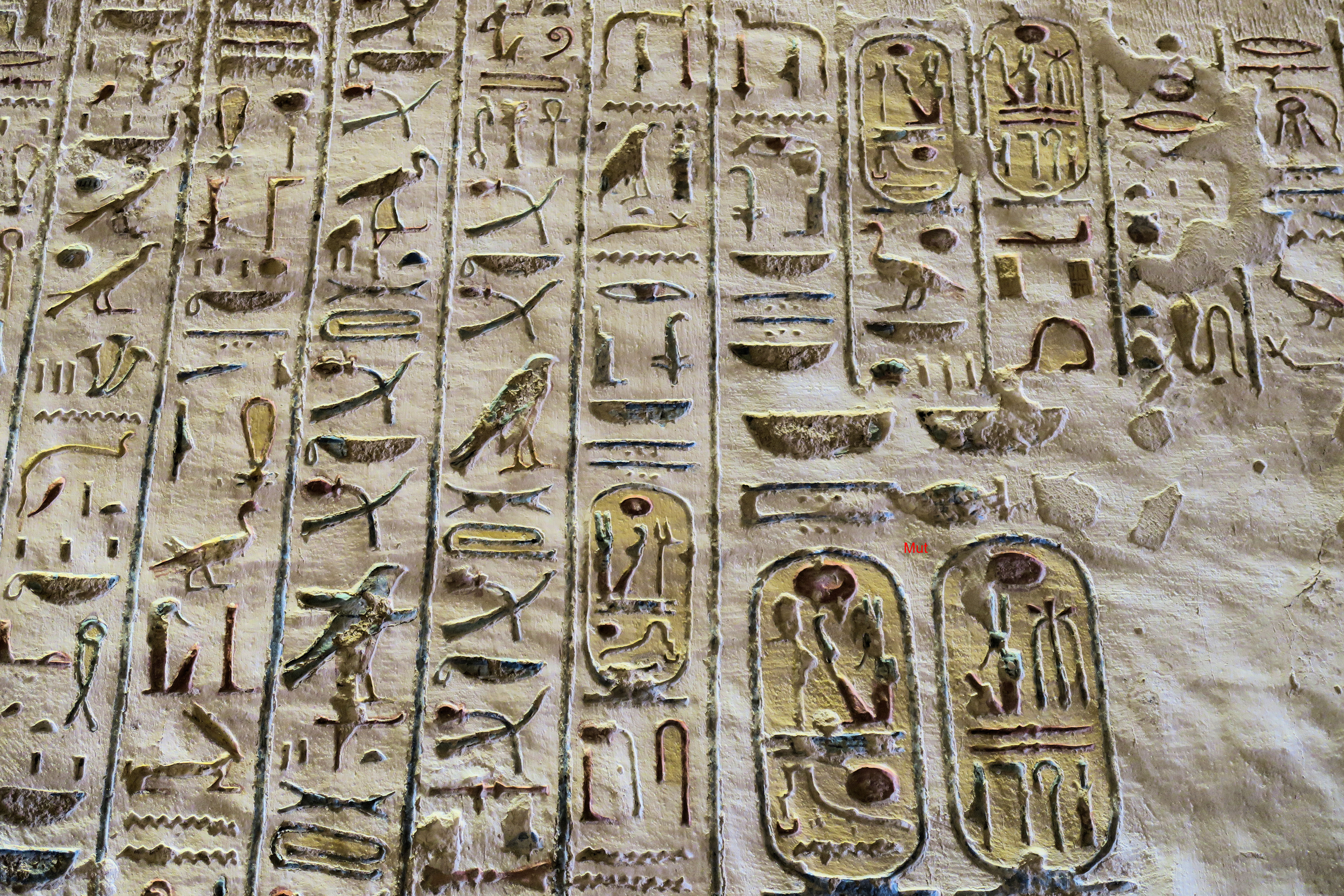
Finely carved wall reliefs in Ramesses VII's KV1 tomb

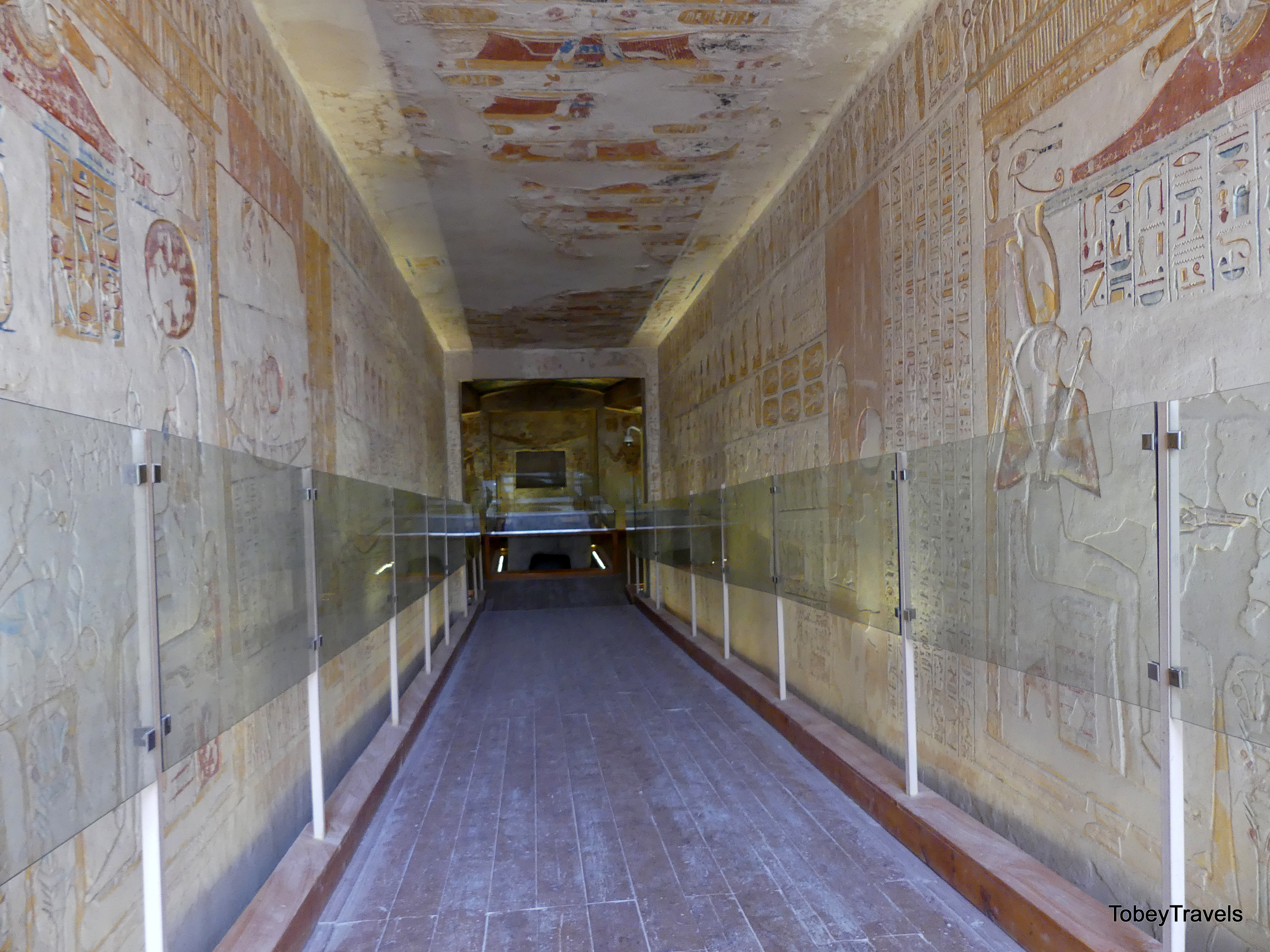
The Tomb Corridor of Ramesses VII's KV1 tomb

=== Mummy ===
His mummy has never been found, though four cups inscribed with the pharaoh's name were found in the "royal cache" in DB320 along with the remains of other pharaohs.
