= Bruce Boucher =

American art historian (born 1948)

Bruce Ambler Boucher FSA (b. November 1948) is an American art historian and curator. He is Deborah Loeb Brice Director of Sir John Soane's Museum, London and emeritus professor of the History of Art at University College London (UCL).

== Early life and education ==
Bruce Boucher was born in 1948 in Birmingham, Alabama, United States to John Walter and Louise Ambler Boucher.

From 1966 to 1970 Boucher read for a bachelor's degree in Classics (Latin) and English at Harvard University graduating magna cum laude. He was awarded a Rhodes Scholarship to Oxford University in 1970 where he studied for a BA and MA in English Language and Literature at Magdalen College. Having developed an interest in the art and architecture of Italy, Boucher changed direction and attended The Courtauld Institute of Art, London, from 1972 to 1987. He gained an M.A. with distinction before being awarded a PhD with a doctoral thesis on the Venetian sculptor and architect Jacopo Sansovino that led to the publication of his first book The Sculpture of Jacopo Sansovino in 1991.

While at the Courtauld, Boucher contributed photographs to the Conway Library whose archive, of primarily architectural images, is in the process of being digitised under the wider Courtauld Connects project.

== Career ==
Boucher was a lecturer at UCL from 1976 to 1992 when he became reader in art history. He was appointed professor of the History of Art in 1998. During the 1970s and 1980s Boucher served on the steering committee for various exhibitions; "Andrea Palladio" (Hayward Gallery, 1975), "The Genius of Venice" (Royal Academy of Arts1983), and "Donatello e i suoi" (Florence, 1986).

In 2000 he became a research fellow at the Victoria and Albert Museum, London for two years and served as guest curator on the exhibition "Earth and Fire: Italian Terracotta Sculpture from Donatello to Canova", editing and contributing to the catalogue. The exhibition opened at the Museum of Fine Arts, Houston in November 2001 before being shown at the Victoria and Albert Museum from March 2002.

Boucher returned to America in 2002 as curator of European sculpture at the Art Institute of Chicago and also lectured at the University of Chicago. In March 2009 Boucher was appointed director of the Fralin Museum of Art at the University of Virginia. At the Fralin, Boucher oversaw major renovation works and curated a number of exhibitions; "From Classic to Romantic: British Art in an Age of Transition" (2010), "The Adoration of the Magi by Bartolo di Fredi: A Masterpiece Reconstructed" (2012), and "Cavaliers Collect" (2015).

In May 2016 Boucher was welcomed as director of Sir John Soane's Museum. He oversaw the museum during the COVID-19 pandemic and lockdown and remains in post although he has announced that he will retire at the end of 2023.

== Honours and appointments to public bodies ==
- Salimbeni Prize 1992 for The Sculpture of Jacopo Sansovino, Yale University Press, New Haven and London, 1991.
- Fellow of the Society of Antiquaries of London. Elected October 10, 2014.
- The National Museum Directors' Council (NMDC).
- Life Member of the Society of Architectural Historians.
- Foreign Member of the Ateneo Veneto in Venice.
- Former President of the Board of The Center for Palladian Studies in America. Now Emeritus Director.

== Selected publications ==
- Andrea Palladio: The Architect in his Time, New York & London : Abbeville Press, 2007, 2nd revised edition 2020, ISBN 0789209403
- Hogarth: Place and Progress, David Bindman, Bruce Boucher, Frédéric Ogée and Jacqueline Riding, London : Sir John Soane's Museum, 2019, ISBN 9781999693213
- Sir John Soane's Museum: A Complete Description, London : Pimpernel Press, 2018, ISBN 9780993204166
- Old Masters at the Art Institute of Chicago, Art Institute of Chicago, 2007, ISBN 9780300119510
- Earth and Fire: Italian Terracotta Sculpture from Donatello to Canova, editor and contributor with others, New Haven & London : Yale University Press, 2001,ISBN 0300090803
- Italian Baroque Sculpture, London : Thames and Hudson, 1998, ISBN 0500203075
- The Sculpture of Jacopo Sansovino, New Haven & London : Yale University Press, 1991, ISBN 0300047592
