= CPSA =

CPSA may refer to:

- Caborrojeños Pro Salud y Ambiente, Cabo Rojo, Puerto Rico
- Canadian Political Science Association
- Canadian Professional Sales Association
- The Center for Palladian Studies in America, Inc.
- China Practical Shooting Association
- Church of the Province of Southern Africa, the former name of the Anglican Church of Southern Africa
- Civil and Public Services Association, a former British trade union
- Clay Pigeon Shooting Association, governing the sport in England
- College of Physicians and Surgeons of Alberta
- Communist Party in Saudi Arabia
- Communist Party of South Africa
- Consumer Product Safety Act
- CPSA, the Kolkata Metro station code for Central Park metro station, West Bengal, India
