= Manufacturers' Agents National Association =

North American professional association

Manufacturers’ Agents National Association
- Abbreviation: MANA
- Formation: 1947; 79 years ago
- Type: Nonprofit professional association
- Legal status: 501(c) organization
- Location: Cincinnati, Ohio, United States
- Official language: English
- CEO & President: Charles M. Cohon
- Website: www.manaonline.org

The Manufacturers’ Agents National Association (MANA) is a North American professional association that supports Manufacturers' representatives. It was founded in 1947.

It is an industry-independent association for representatives and their principals. Its focus is on representative and principal education and matchmaking. Activities focus on helping representatives and principals launch and sustain long-term relationships. Matchmaking activities involve introducing representatives and principals whose products and business models match and launch the interview process.

== Associations ==
Representative associations that focus on specific industries are referred to as vertical associations. Many representative companies and principals belong to both MANA and the vertical association that supports their industry. In part these include:

- Association of Independent Manufacturers’/ Representatives, Inc.
- Canadian Professional Sales Association
- Electronics Representatives Association
- Electronics Representatives Association Southern California Chapter
- Equipment Marketing & Distribution Association
- The Foodservice Group, Inc.
- Foodservice Sales & Marketing Association
- Gift and Home Trade Association
- Heavy Duty Representatives Association
- Health Industry Representatives Association
- International Housewares Representatives Association
- Industrial Manufacturers’ Representative Association
- Manufacturers’ Agents of Cincinnati
- Manufacturers’ Agents Association for the Food Service Industry
- Manufacturers’ Representatives Educational Research Foundation
- National Association General Merchandise Representatives
- National Electrical Manufacturers Representatives Association
- National Marine Representatives Association
- Professional Sales Representative Organization
- Power-Motion Technology Representatives Association
- Shoe and Accessory Travelers Association
- Society of Manufacturers’ Representatives
- Wisconsin Association of Manufacturers’ Agents
- Commission People Association
- United Association Manufacturers’ Reps
- Wood Reps
