= Tomb of Seti I =

Tomb of Pharaoh Seti I in the Valley of the Kings, Egypt

KV17
- Burial site of Seti I
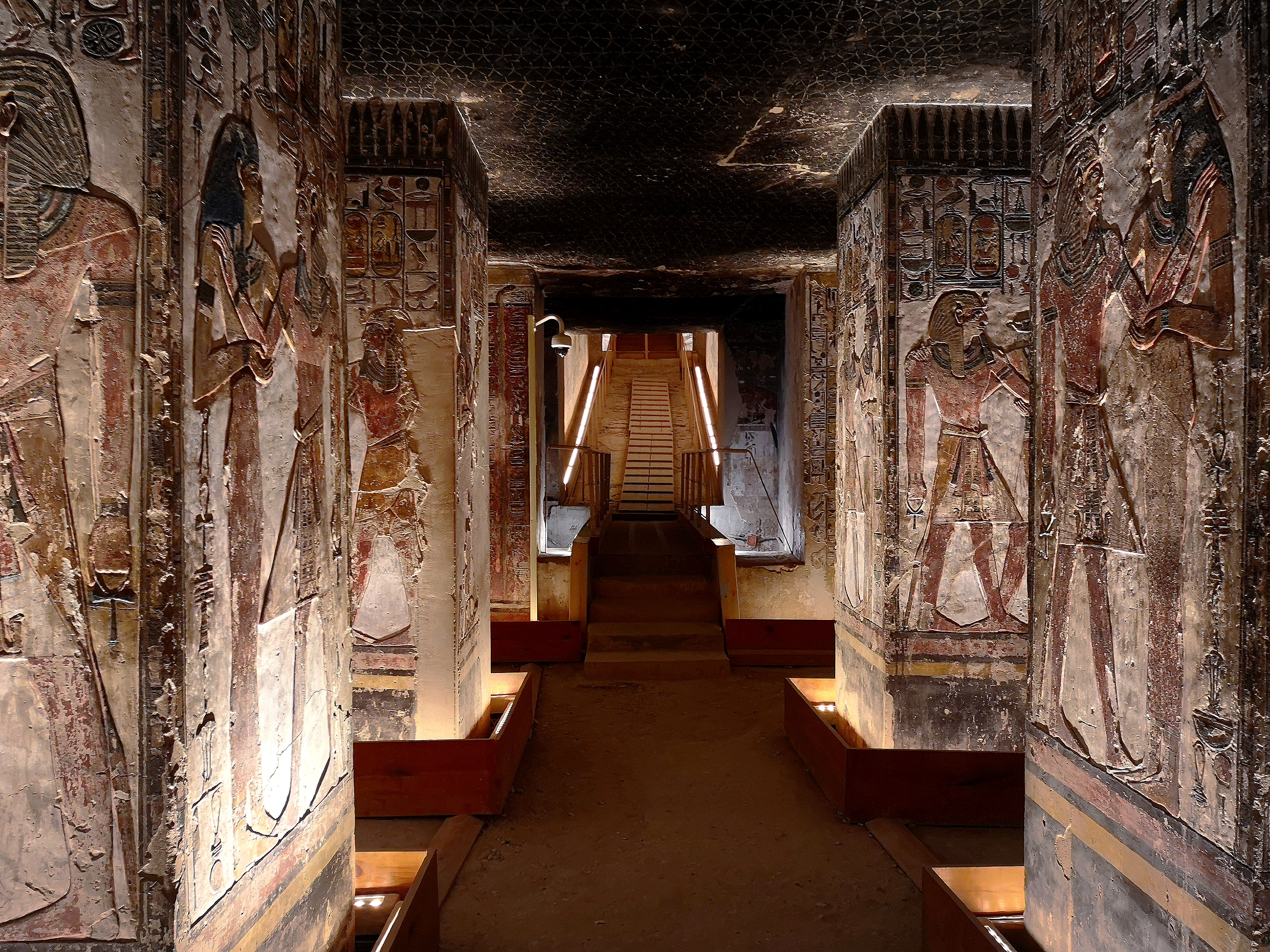
- Interior of the tomb (upper pillared hall)

- Location within Egypt
- Coordinates: 25°44′23.3″N 32°36′06.8″E
- Location: East Valley of the Kings
- Discovered: 16 October 1817
- Excavated by: Giovanni Belzoni
- Decoration: Opening of the mouth ceremony, Book of Gates, Litany of Re, Book of the Dead, Amduat, Book of the Heavenly Cow
- Layout: Joggled axis
- ← Previous; KV16 Next → KV18

The tomb of Seti I, also known by its tomb number, KV17, is the burial place of Pharaoh Seti I of Egypt's Nineteenth Dynasty. Located in the Valley of the Kings on the west bank of the Nile near Thebes, it is considered one of the largest, deepest and most elaborately decorated royal tombs in the valley. The tomb is also known as Belzoni's Tomb, the Tomb of Apis and the Tomb of Psammis, son of Nechois.

KV17 is particularly significant for its extensive decor which covers much of its corridors, chambers and ceilings. Its wall paintings and reliefs depict religious texts and scenes that are associated with the Egyptian understanding of death and the afterlife. The tomb itself represents important development in New Kingdom royal burial architecture and combs an elaborate underground layout with extensive religious decoration.

The tomb was discovered by an Italian explorer named Giovanni Battista Belzoni on October 16, 1817. His discovery of the tomb brought considerable attention to the tomb's unusually well-preserved decorations as well as its large alabaster sarcophagus.

== Design ==
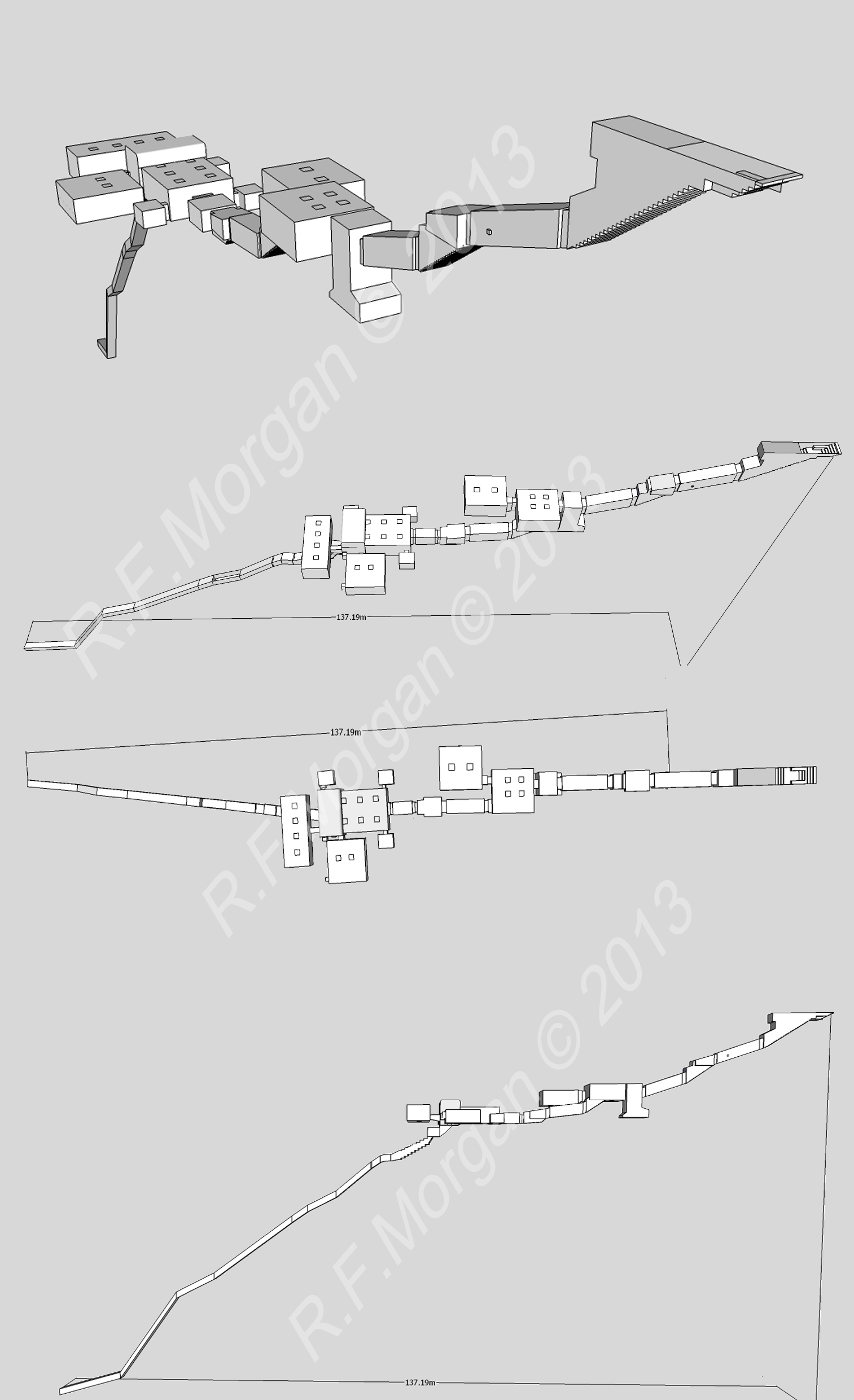
Schematic of the tomb

KV17 follows a complex architectural plan consisting of a sequence of descending corridors and chambers. Its layout is not arranged along one uninterrupted straight axis but rather, the passageways change direction as they extend deeper into the rock. The tomb's architectural arrangement demonstrates the increasing complexity of royal burial architecture during the New Kingdom.

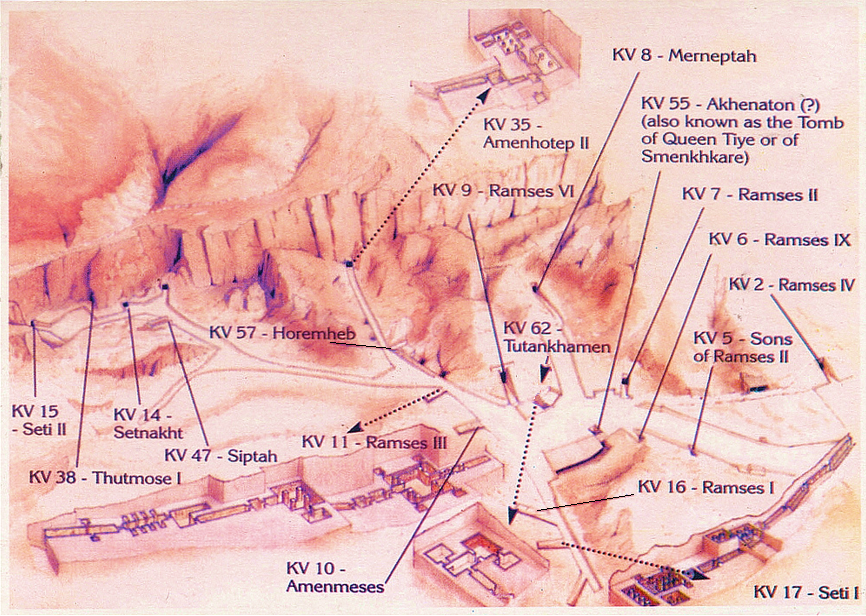
Map of Valley of The Kings showing the location of KV17.

The tomb extends approximately 137 meters and contains a series of interconnected chambers and corridors as well as including additional subsidiary rooms. Its architectural plan identifies sections labeled A-K with additional subdivisions such as Fa and Ja-Je. The interior includes descending entrance corridors, a well shaft, pillared chambers, connecting passageways and a large burial chamber. The longitudinal sections also reveal changes in floor elevation and ceiling height throughout the tomb, illustrating its complex underground construction.

The burial chamber is particularly significant for its elaborate religious decoration. Its astronomical ceiling imagery relates to ancient Egyptian beliefs about the king's transformation and journey throughout the afterlife. Together, with the decorated walls and subsidiary chambers, these features demonstrate how the tomb's architecture and decorative program were designed to express royal resurrection and the king's eternal existence.

The architectural arrangement of KV17 demonstrates the relationship between the physical construction of royal tombs and their religious purpose. Egyptian royal tombs were not simply places to store the deceased king's remains but rather sacred spaces that supported the pharaoh's transformation and continued existence after death. Their passageways and chambers provide settings for religious texts and images intended to assist the deceased ruler in navigating the afterlife.

One of the tomb's most notable architectural features is its vaulted burial chamber, which is the first of its kind. It contains a series of decorated pillars and adjoining rooms. The chamber also connects to a descending subterrain passage, known as Corridor K, which continues beneath the burial chamber. This passage was investigated during later archaeological excavations, although its unstable geological conditions created difficulties for researchers.

=== Decoration ===
Erik Hornung's study of the tomb emphasizes the importance of its comprehensive decorative program. KV17 is particularly significant because its religious imagery extends throughout the tomb rather than being restricted to only a few selected chambers. The arrangement of these texts and images creates a connected religious program associated with the king's journey through the underworld and his eventual rebirth.

The entry corridors (Corridors B–D) are heavily decorated with symbols of the Pharaoh, like those of Ma'at and a list of Set's royal names and epithets. One of the back chambers is decorated with the Opening of the mouth ceremony, which shows the Egyptian belief that a magic religious ceremony would open the lungs and throat of the mummy, allowing them to breathe in the afterlife. Considered a very important religious ceremony, a semi-complete depiction of this ritual provides an in-depth view of the pantheon of practices undertaken to ensure safe passage into the afterlife. Further into the tomb are numerous depictions of King Seti with numerous Gods. Chamber F depicts images of Seti with Hathor, Horus and Neith, along with intact mural examples of the Book of Gates.

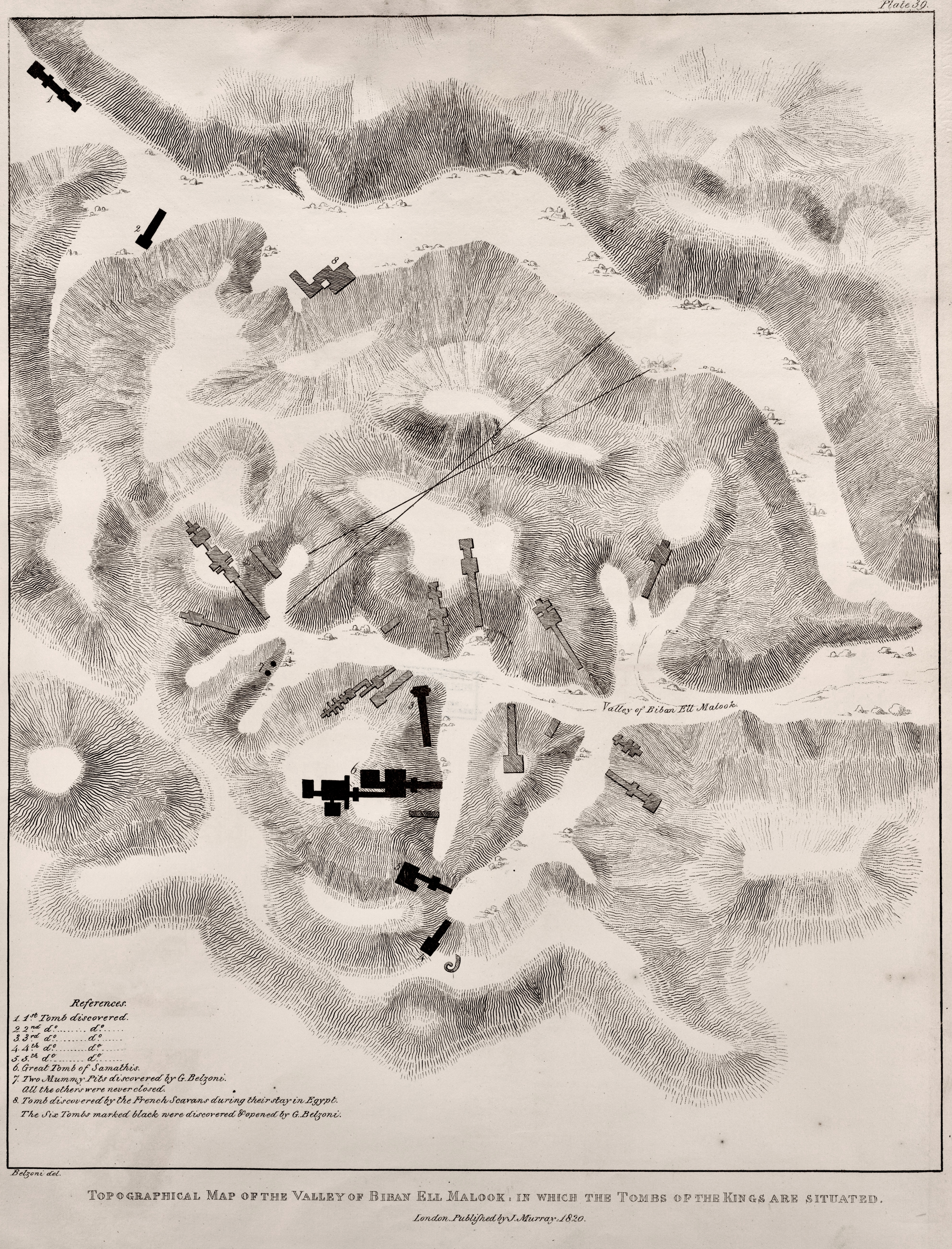
Map of Belzoni's discoveries in the Valley of the Kings. KV17 is marked as "6. Great Tomb of Samathis".

The tomb is covered floor to ceiling by detailed murals and reliefs. The ceiling of the vaulted burial chamber depicts a series of astronomical motifs, with golden stars on a deep blue background. Other decorations are religious in nature, including depictions of the Litany of Ra, the Book of The Dead, the Imydwat, the Book of The Heavenly Cow and depictions of Seti with various deities. There are also depictions of the King alone, standing in the pillars of the room. Each room is heavily decorated, both wall and ceiling, along with numerous columns and floor skirting. Much of the floor skirting is damaged, due to both the ravages of time and the damage due to excavation.

Parts of the tomb ceilings have been painted with gold stars on a deep blue sky, a common motif in temples and tombs in Egypt. Numerous rooms in Seti's tomb use the motif, including rooms such as side chamber Jb with the Imydwat. There are many richly decorated rooms, with their own general themes.

The decoration of KV17 is important not only because of its artistic quality but also because it provides evidence of Egyptian religious beliefs during the Nineteenth Dynasty. The combination of funerary texts, astronomical imagery, and representations of the gods illustrates how architecture and religious art worked together in royal burial practices.

== Archaeology and conservation ==
The tomb was uncovered by Italian explorer and early Egyptologist Giovanni Belzoni on 16 October 1817. Upon entering the tomb, Belzoni found the wall paintings in excellent condition with the paint on the walls still looking fresh, and some of the artists' paints and brushes still on the floor. The tomb became known as the "Apis tomb" upon the discovery of a mummified Apis Bull found in a side room off the burial hall when Belzoni uncovered the tomb.

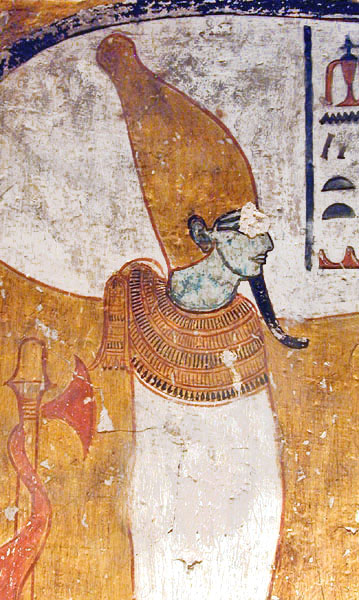
Depiction of Osiris in the Tomb of Seti I. Jean-Pierre Dalbéra

The body identified as Seti's mummy was not found in his coffin upon Belzoni's discovery of the tomb, but rather in the royal cache DB320 amongst 36 other mummies. His coffin (perhaps the inner or secondary coffin) was heavily damaged, as was his mummy. It has been postulated that priests of numerous dynasties attempted restorations of both his tomb and his coffin, but his mummy was finally moved in the Year 11 of Shoshenq I to cache DB320. The outer coffin was going to be sold by Belzoni to the British Museum in 1817, but it was sold for US$2000 to architect Sir John Soane later that year, and now rests in the Sir John Soane's Museum.

Much of the structural damage to the tomb before the 1950s and 1960s was caused by Belzoni. Belzoni, in an effort to bring back pieces of Egyptian art, damaged much of the work within the tomb. He made "squeezes", a form of copying artwork by pressing wet wax, plaster and sometimes paper against the reliefs; when they dried, the color was pulled away, and a negative impression was made of the carvings, but it also damaged many of the reliefs and carvings. Beyond the use of "squeezes", Belzoni also hacked off large pieces of relief to send back to Europe, along with clearing rubble that held back flash floodwaters; the tomb subsequently flooded, damaging large portions of the structure and damaged the reliefs in the entryway.

The outer layer of the sarcophagus of Seti I, removed on behalf of the British consul Henry Salt, is located in the Sir John Soane's Museum in London since 1824. Jean-François Champollion, translator of the Rosetta Stone, removed a wall panel of 2.26 x 1.05 m in a corridor with mirror-image scenes during his 1828–29 expedition. Other elements were removed by his companion Rossellini or by Karl Richard Lepsius in the German expedition of 1845. The scenes are now in the collections of the Louvre in Paris, the Egyptian Museum in Florence, and the Neues Museum in Berlin.

A number of walls in the tomb have collapsed or cracked due to excavations in the late 1950s and early 1960s causing significant changes in the moisture levels in the surrounding rocks.

There have been a number of recent 21st century attempts at preservation, both through image-mapping projects like the Theban Mapping Project and the Maidan Project, and through intense laser scanning of the reliefs on the walls of the tomb by the Factum Foundation, leading to many of the images within the tomb being available to the public. A 3-D scan of the temple was made available in 2002, allowing viewers to 'walk' through the tomb through a series of 3D photos.

Facsimiles of two rooms from the tomb, the Hall of Beauties and Pillared Hall J, were made by the Factum Foundation for Digital Technology in Conservation in 2017.

== Tourism ==
KV17 has become an important archaeological attraction in the Valley of the Kings because of its size, architectural design and its extensive decorative program. Its elaborate wall paintings and religious imagery make it particularly significant among the royal tombs of the New Kingdom.

However, preservation has remained a major concern. The tomb's underground structure is vulnerable to environmental changes, including fluctuation in humidity and moisture, as well as damage associated with large numbers of visitors. As a result of excavation and the damages of improperly regulated tourism, visits have historically been restricted at times, as archaeology efforts in the 1950s and 1960s have made parts of the tomb unstable. However, as of 2025, the Tomb was open for visits.

== Gallery ==
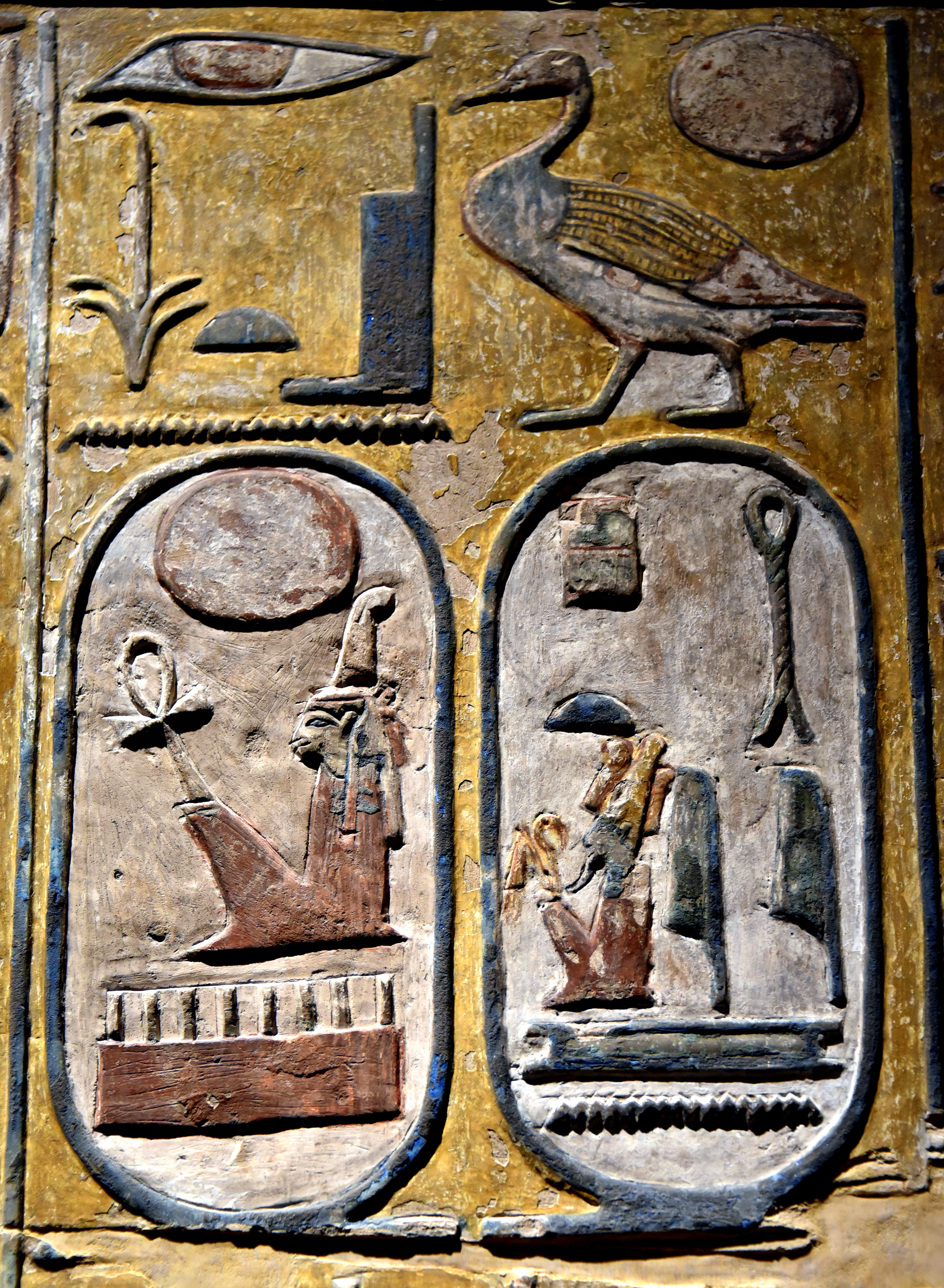
Birth and throne cartouches of pharaoh Seti I, from KV17. Neues Museum

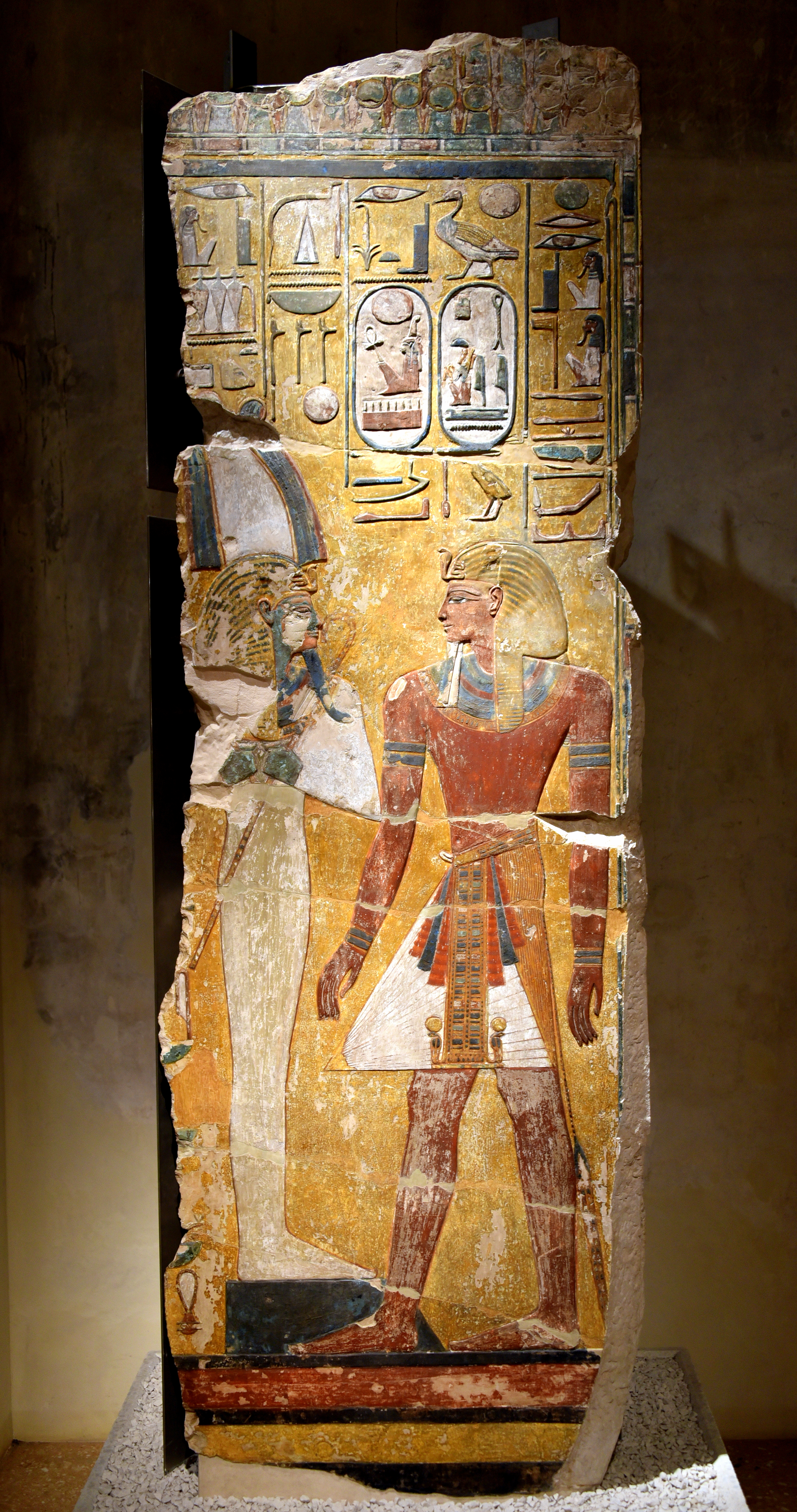
Relief of Pharaoh Seti I before Osiris, wall painting from KV17, Hall J, Pillar B, side a. Neues Museum

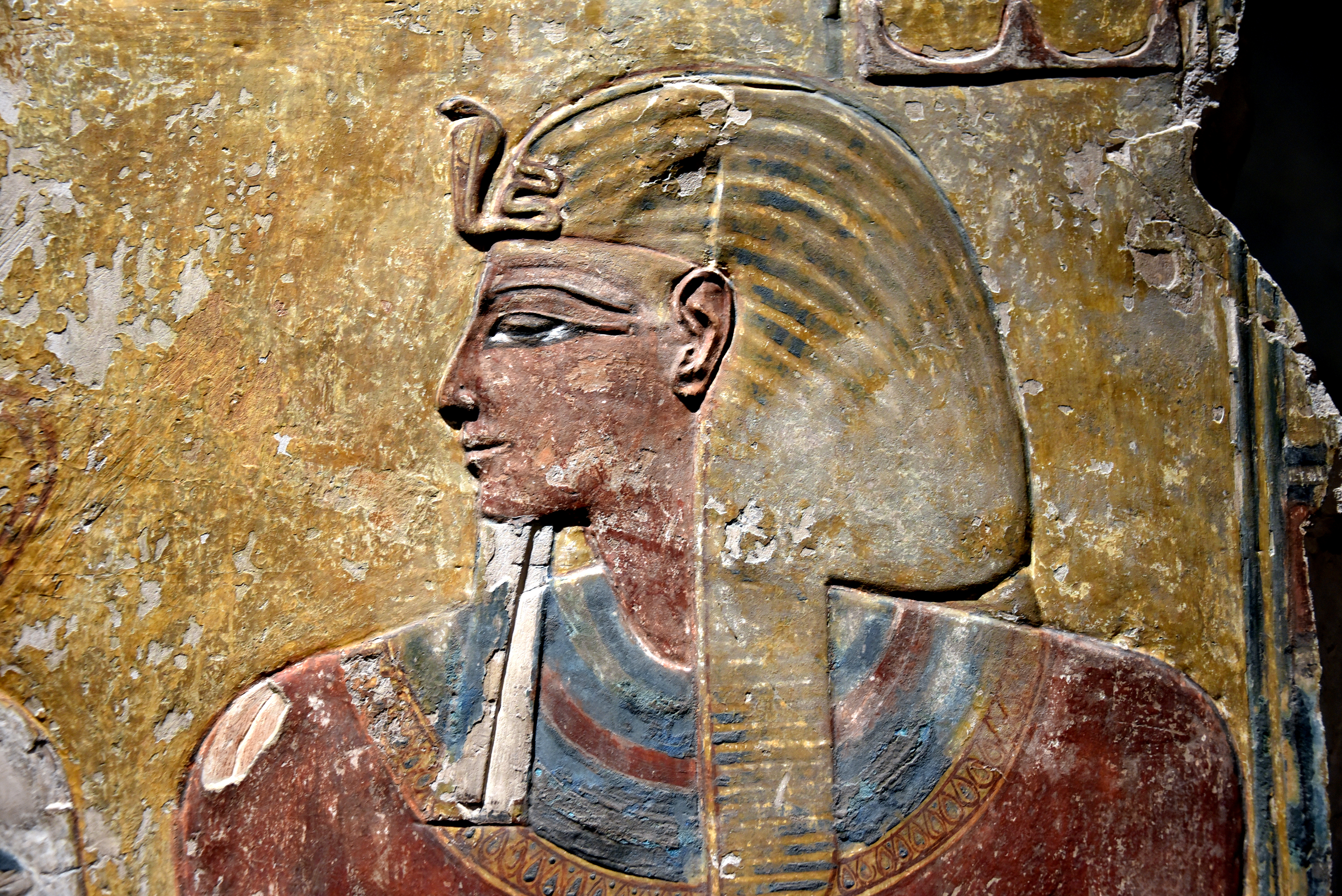
Pharaoh Seti I, detail of a wall painting from the Tomb of Seti I at the Valley of the Kings. Neues Museum

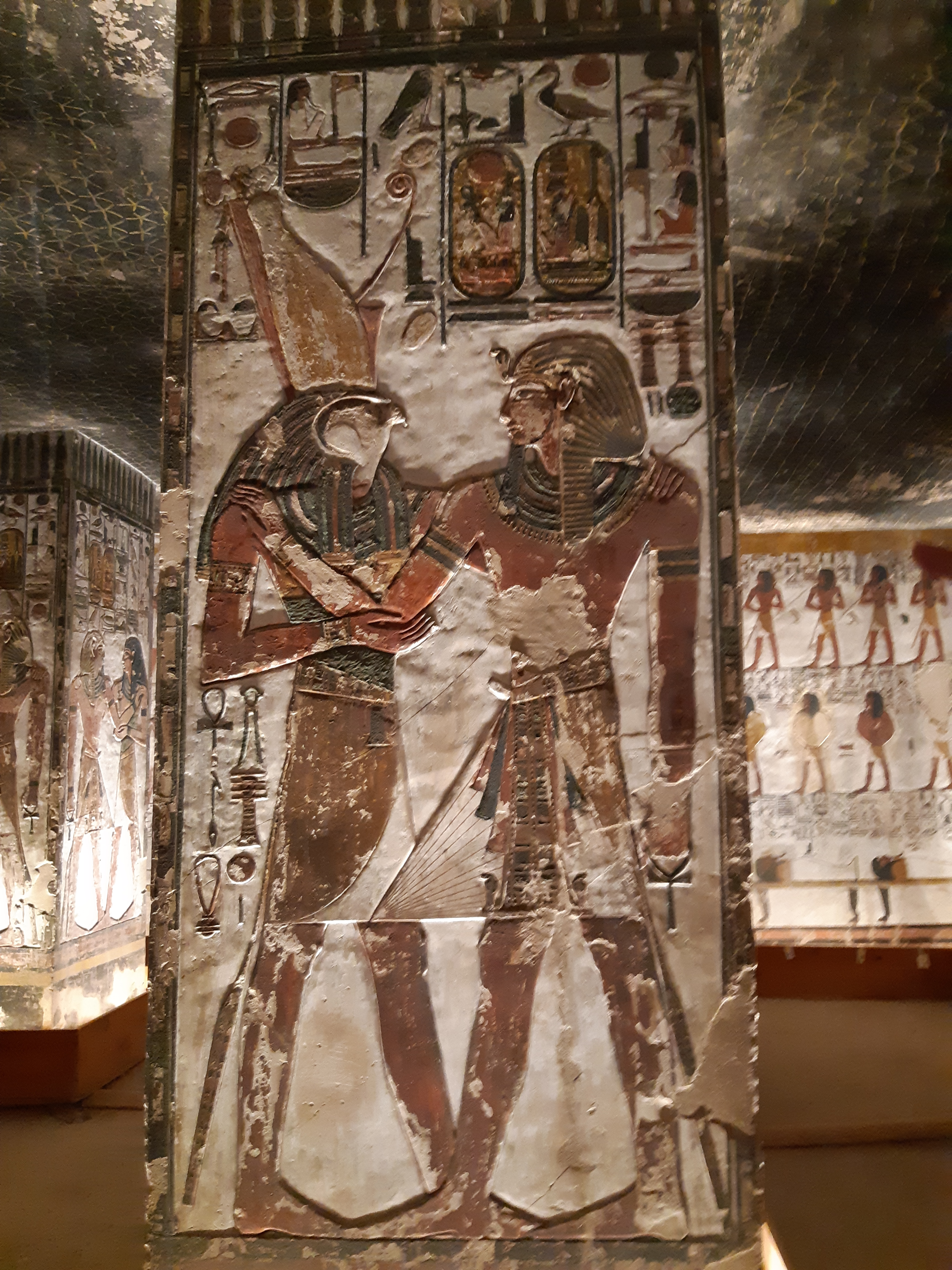
Seti I with Horus

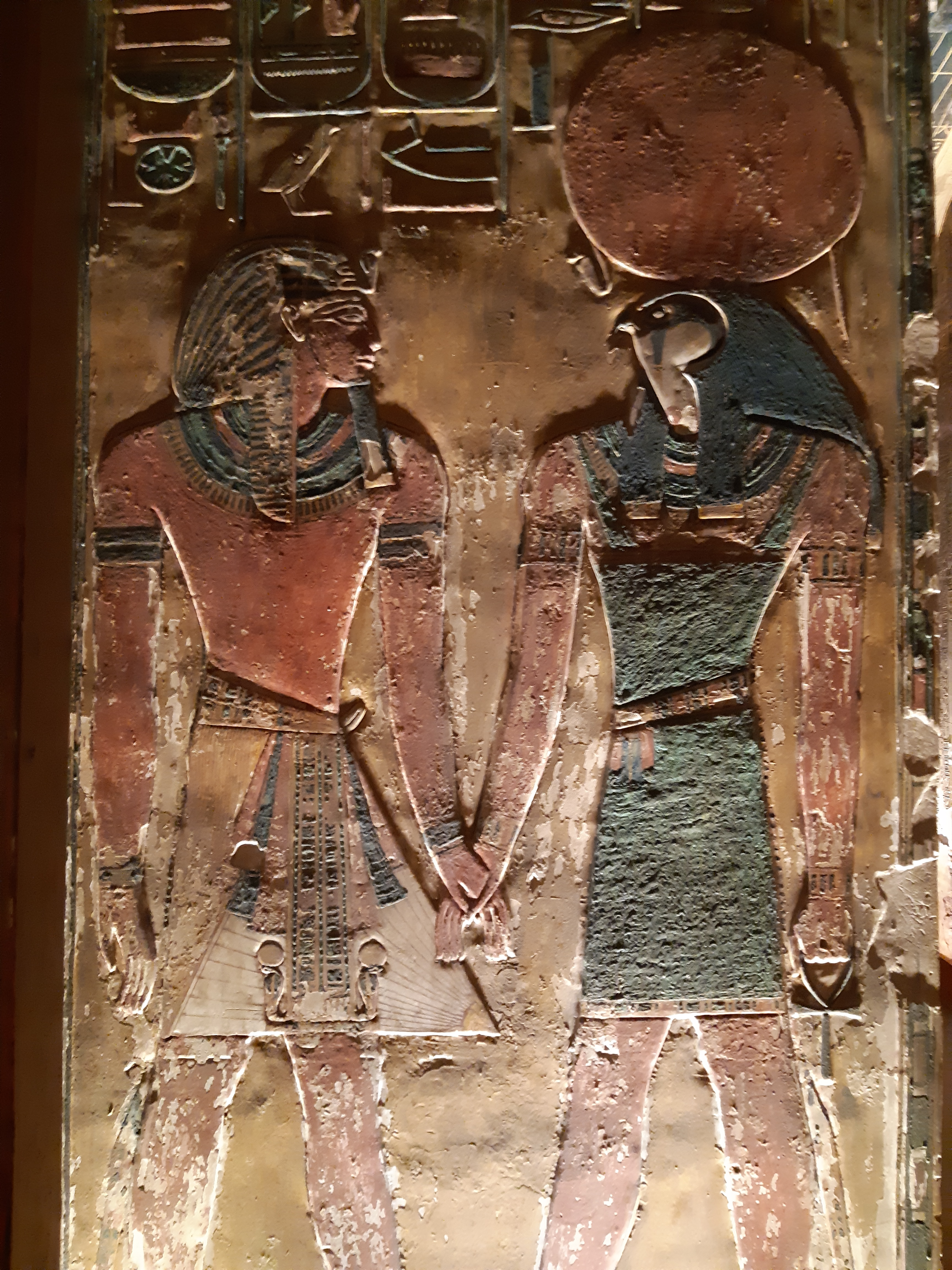
Seti I with Ra

Seti I with Thoth

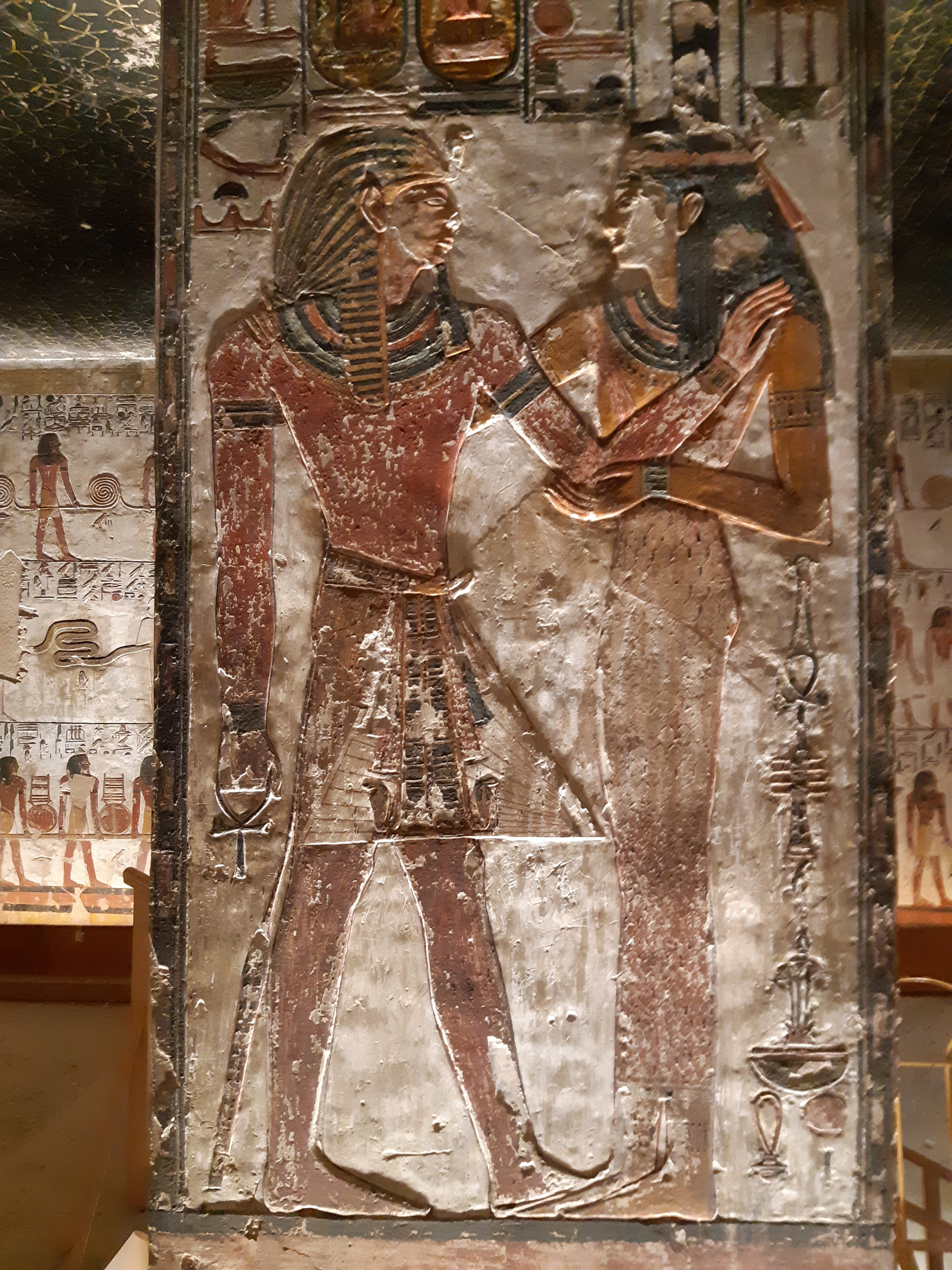
Seti I with Isis

Seti I with Hathor

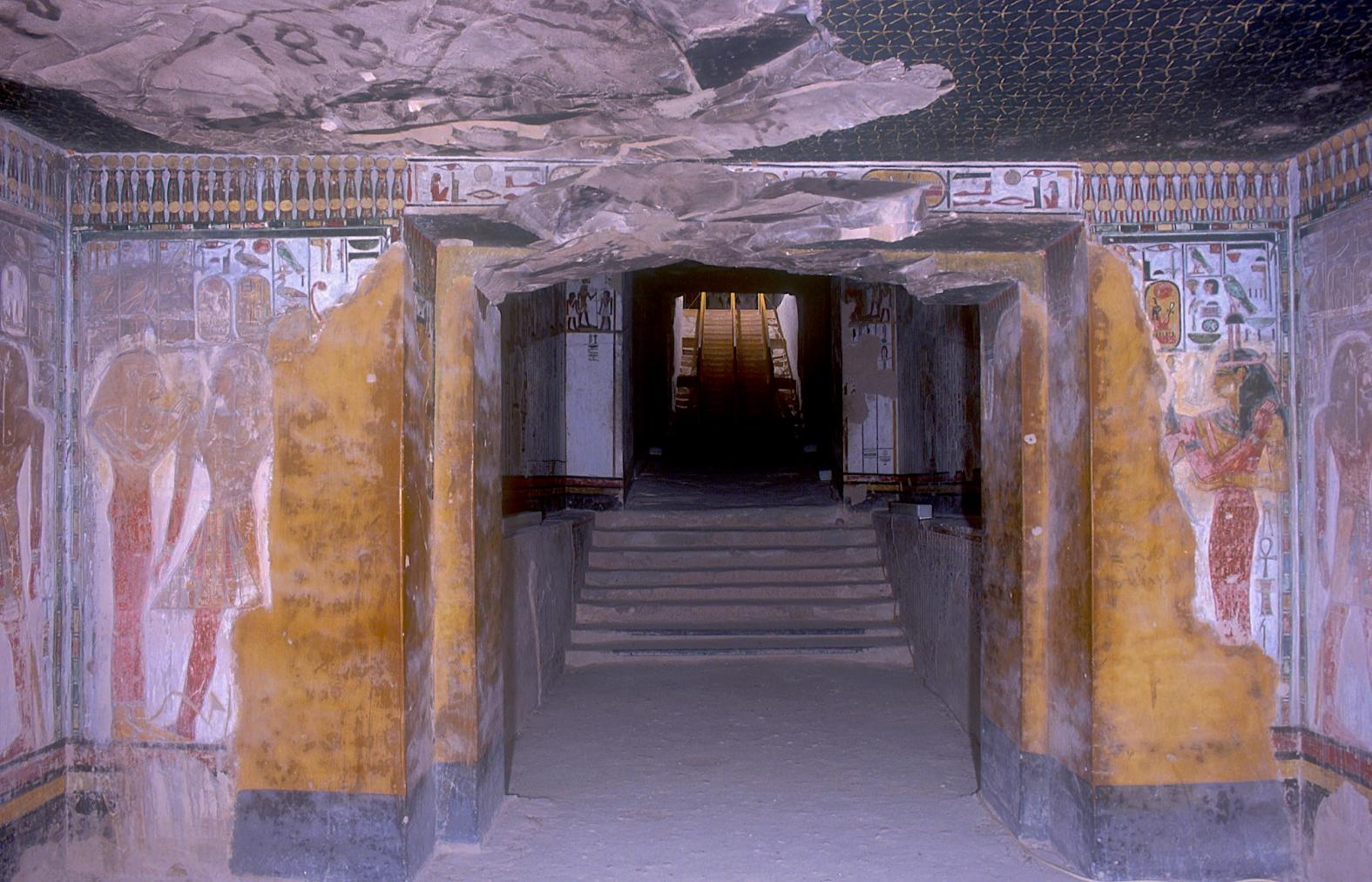
Image depicting the ceiling of Chamber I in the Tomb Of Seti I, Theban Mapping Project.

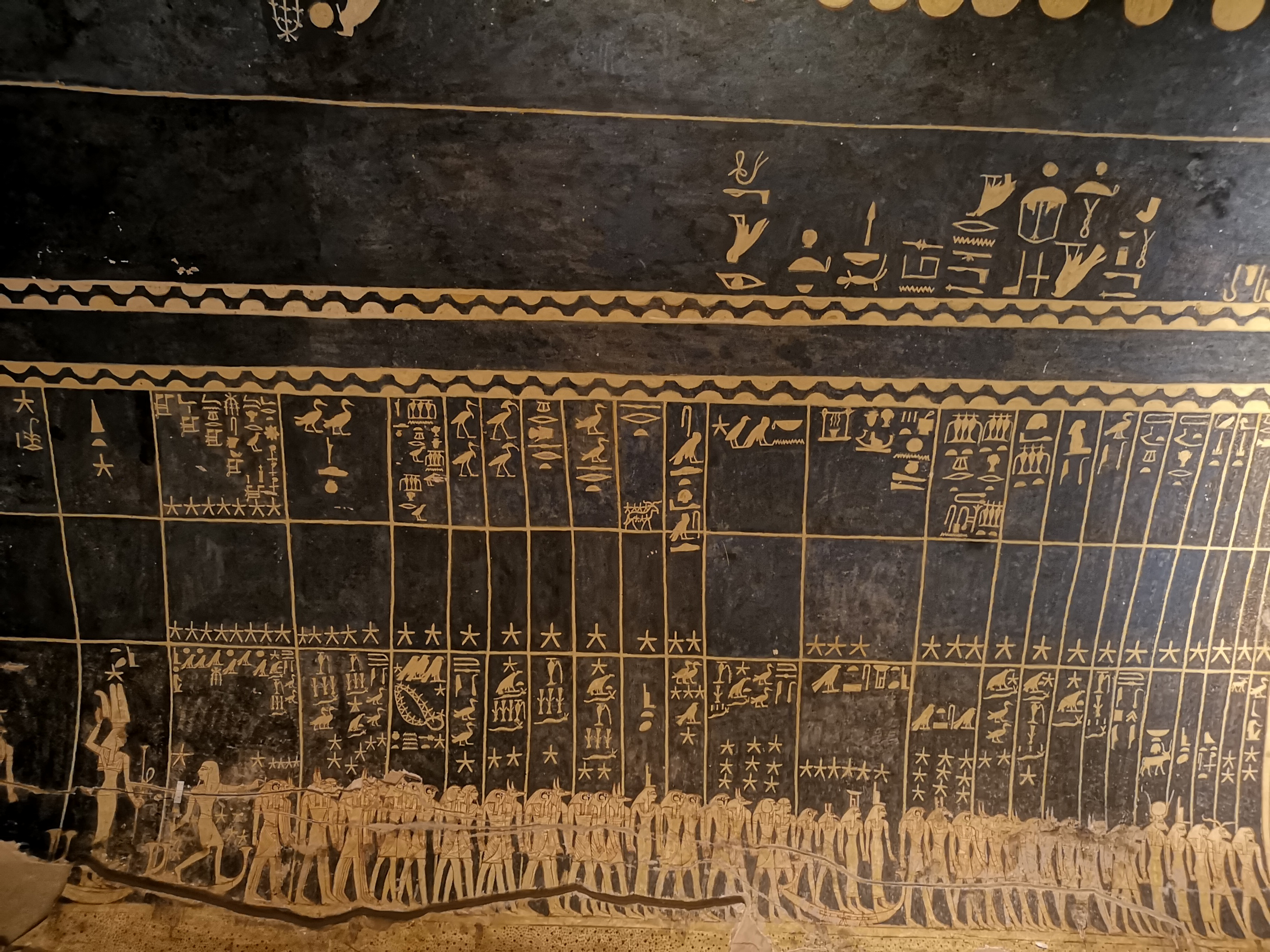
Depiction of gods and godesses on the roof of the tomb

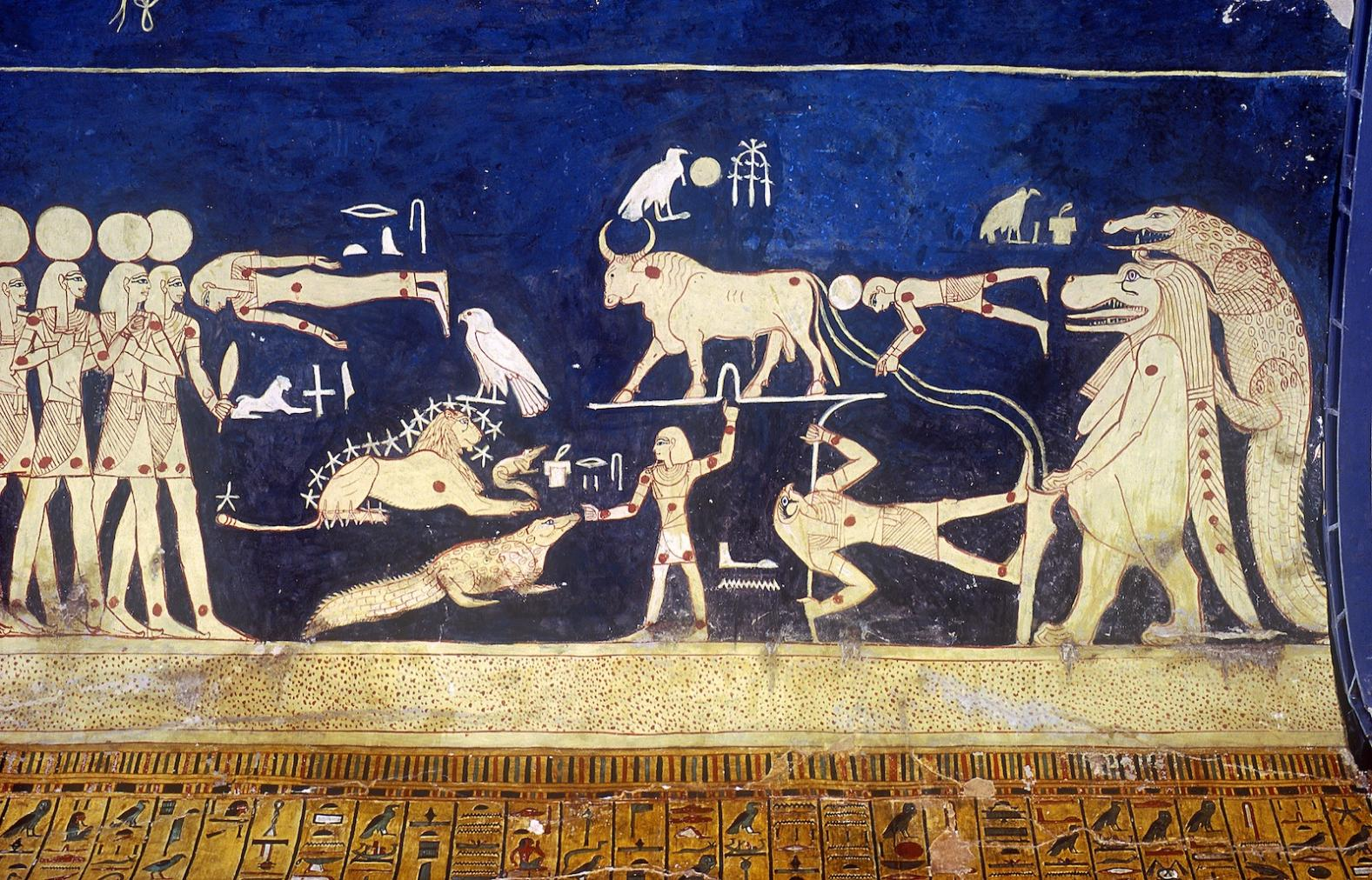
Depiction of circumpolar stars and constellations on the roof of the tomb in room J. Theban Mapping Project.

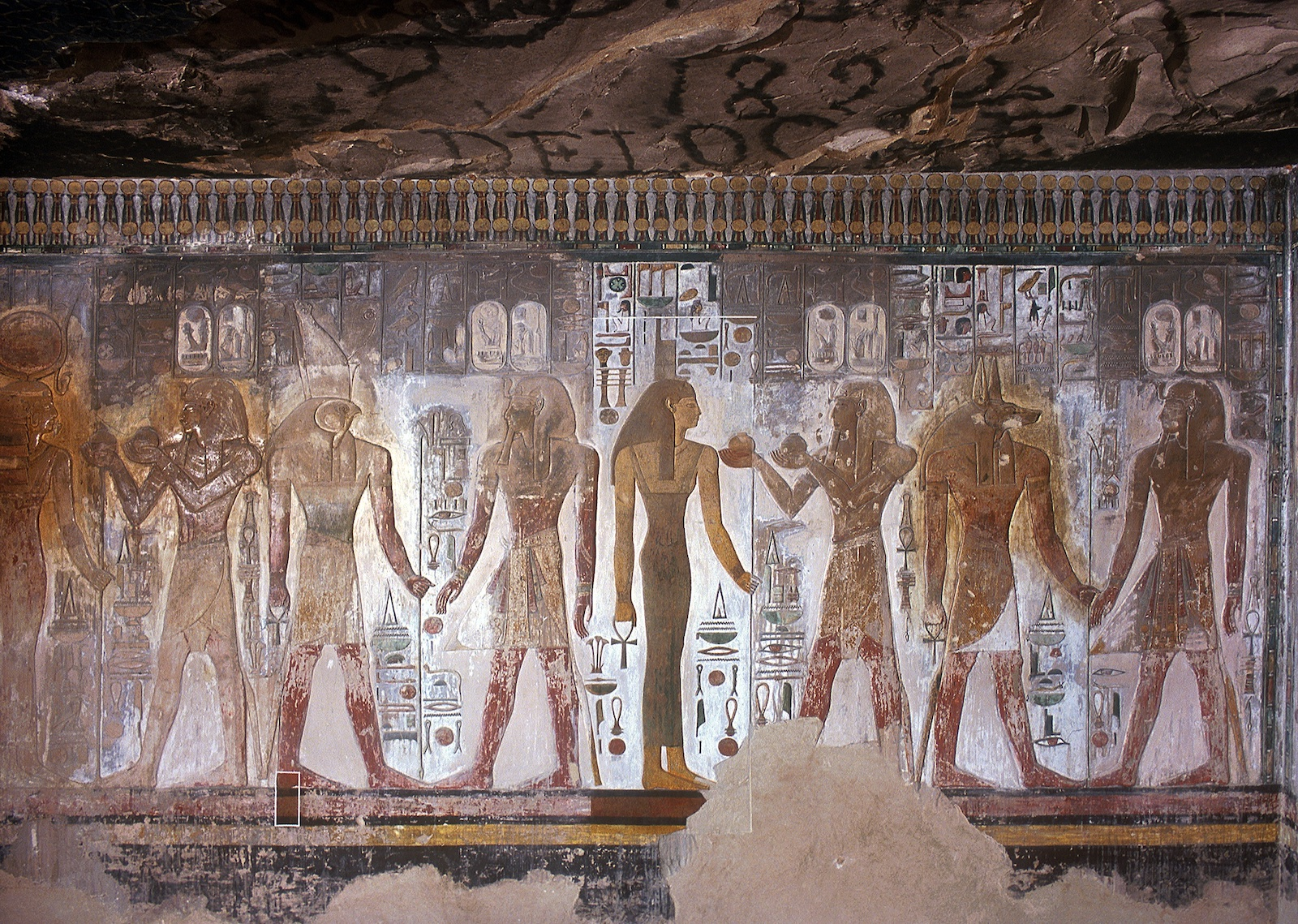
Section of tomb showing wear and tear of graffiti, along with depiction of Seti I with Hathor, Horus, Isis, and Anubis. Theban Mapping Project.

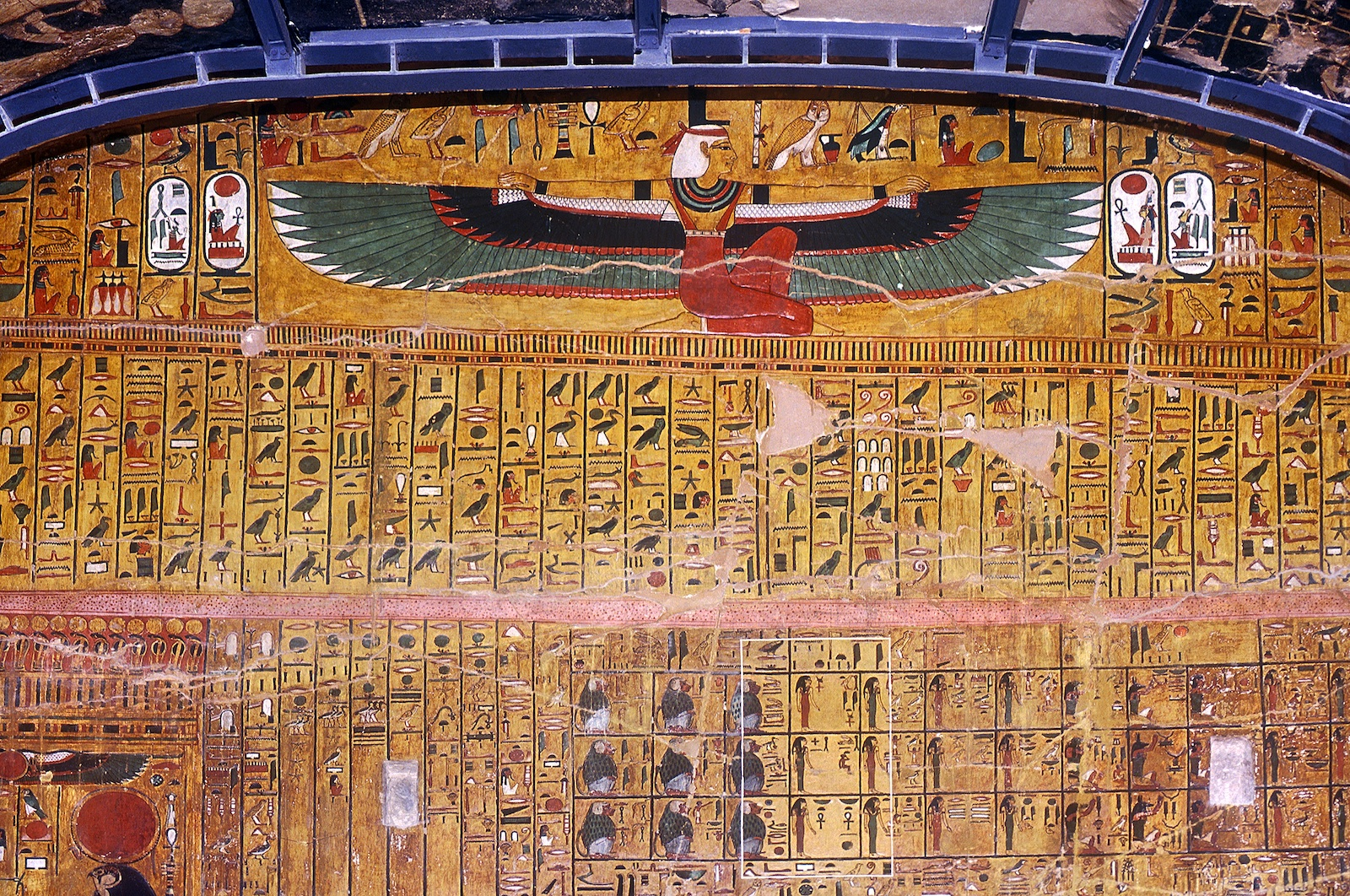
Depiction of abbreviated book of hours, along with a winged Isis. Theban Mapping Project.
