= Sarcophagus of Seti I =

14th century BC Egyptian sarcophagus

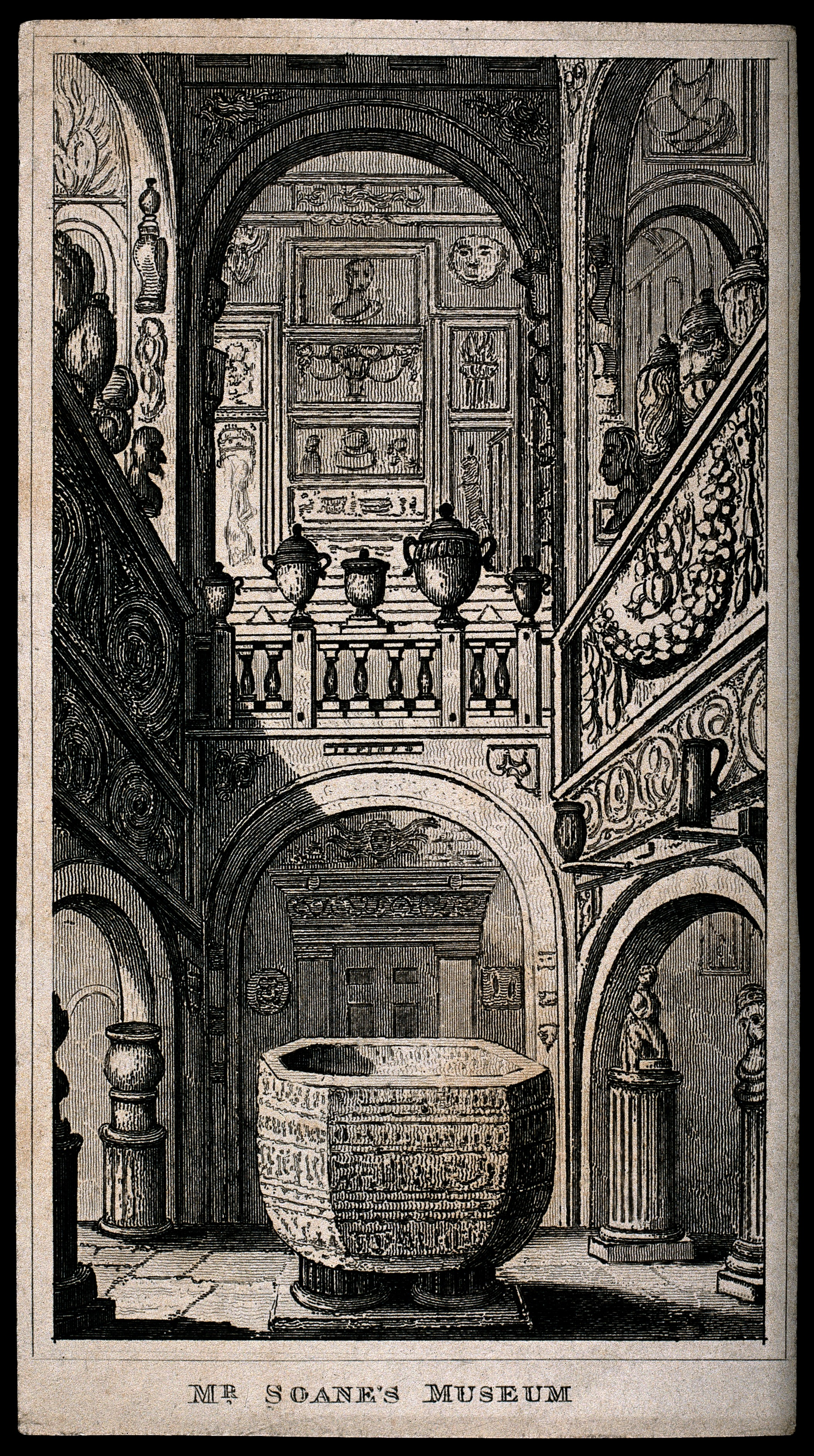
- An 1834–35 engraving of the Sarcophagus of Seti I, on display at Sir John Soane's Museum
- Material: Alabaster with Egyptian blue infill
- Size: Length 2.84 m Width (head): 55.9cm Width (feet): 81.3cm Height (shoulders): 81.3cm Height (lower part, feet): 68.6cm Thickness (lower part, sides): 2.5cm, minimum; 10.2cm, maximum
- Writing: Egyptian hieroglyphs
- Created: 1370 BC
- Discovered: 1817
- Present location: Sir John Soane's Museum, London
- Registration: M470

The sarcophagus of Seti I is a life-size sarcophagus of the 19th Dynasty pharaoh Seti I that was discovered in 1817 by the Italian explorer Giovanni Belzoni in tomb KV17 in the Valley of the Kings, Egypt. Seti I is believed to have died in 1279 BC and the sarcophagus would have housed his coffin and mummy. It was bought by architect Sir John Soane in 1824 for £2000 (equivalent to £222,000 in 2023) after the British Museum turned it down citing Belzoni's steep price. It is currently displayed in the crypt section, called Sepulchral Chamber, of Sir John Soane's Museum in London. Over 3000 years old, the sarcophagus is one of the oldest museum objects in the United Kingdom in public collection.

The sarcophagus has been displayed in a glass case since 1866.

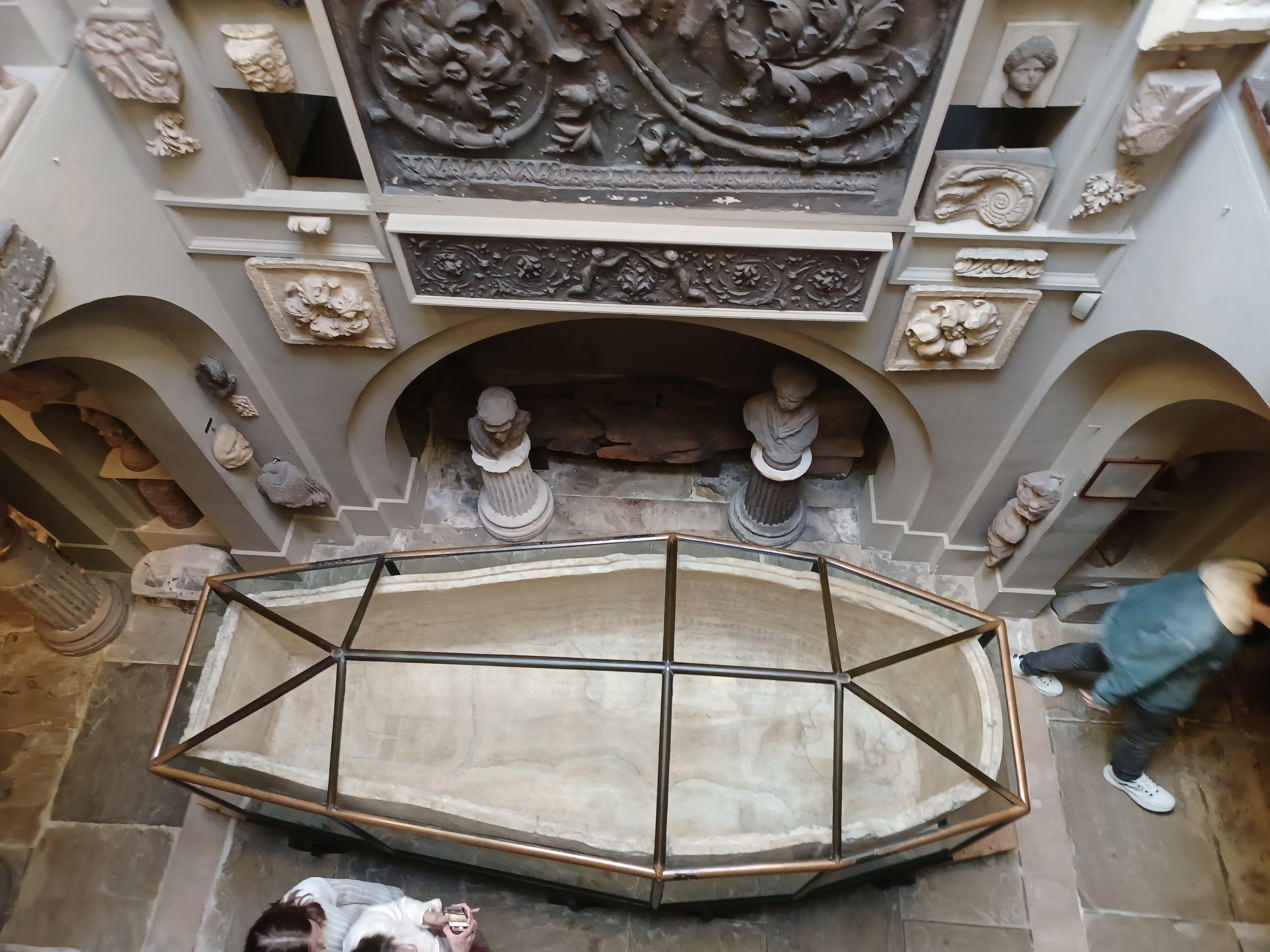
Sarcophagus of Seti I as currently displayed (April 2022).

Factum Foundation produced a replica of the sarcophagus for exhibition in 2017–18 by scanning the original and using elevated printing to create a photo-realistic copy.

== Bibliography ==
- Darley, Gillian (1999). John Soane: An Accidental Romantic. Yale University Press. ISBN 978-0-300-08165-7.
