= Salimbeni Prize =

Award honouring excellence in art history writing on an Italian subject

The Salimbeni Prize (Il Premio Salimbeni per la Storia e la Critica d'Arte) is awarded by the Fondazione Salimbeni per le Arti Figurative of San Severino Marche to honour excellence in the writing of art history on an Italian subject. The Premio Salimbeni was established in 1983.

== List of winners ==
- 1983: Franco Mazzini, I Mattoni e le Pietre di Urbino, Editore Argalia, Urbino, 1982.
- 1984: Sir James Byam Shaw, The Italian Drawing of the Frits Lugt Collection, Institut Néerlandais, Paris.
- 1985: Cristoph Luitpold Frommel, Stefano Ray, Manfredo Tafuri, Raffaello Architetto, Electa Editrice, Milan, 1984.
- 1986: Miklos Boskovits, The Fourteenth Century. The Painters of Miniaturist Tendency, in "A Critical and Historical Corpus of Florentine Painting", Edizioni Giunti-Barbera, Florence, 1984.
- 1987: Fabio Mariano (Editor) and Marcello Agostinelli, Francesco di Giorgio e il Palazzo della Signoria a Jesi, edizioni Cassa di Risparmio di Jesi, Jesi 1986, with Maria Luisa Polichetti (Editor), Il Palazzo di Federico da Montefeltro. Restauri e Ricerche, Edizioni Quattroventi, Urbino, ex aequo.
- 1988: David Alan Brown, Andrea Solario, Electa Editrice, Milan, with Bruno Contardi, Serena Romano, Filippo Titi. Studio di Pittura, Scultura et Architettura nella Chiese di Roma, Editrice Centro Di, Firenze, and with Nicola Spinosa, Pittura Napoletana del Settecento, Electa Napoli Editrice.
- 1989: Giulia De Marchi, Mostre di Quadri in San Salvatore in Lauro (1682-1725) - Stime di Collezioni Romane. Note e appunti di Giuseppe Ghezzi, Miscellanea della Società Romana di Storia Patria, XXVII, Roma, presso la Società della Biblioteca Vallicelliana, 1987.
- 1990: Filippo Todini, La Pittura Umbra dal Duecento al primo Cinquecento, tomi I - II, Longanesi, 1988.
- 1991: Paride Berardi, Giovanni Antonio Bellinzoni da Pesaro, Nuova Alfa Editoriale - Banca Popolare Pesarese, 1988.
- 1992: Bruce Boucher, The Sculpture of Jacopo Sansovino, Yale University Press, London, 1991, with Giuliana Algeri e Anna de Floriani, La Pittura in Liguria. Il Quattrocento, Cassa di Risparmio di Genova e Imperia, 1991.
- 1993: Paolo Dal Poggetto (a cura di), Le Arti nelle Marche al tempo di Sisto V, Cassa di Risparmio di Ascoli Piceno, realizzazione Silvana Editoriale, 1992.
- 1994: Julian Kliemann, Gesta Dipinte. La grande decorazione nelle dimore italiane dal Quattrocento al Seicento.
- 1995: Arnold Nesselrath, Das Fossombroner Skizzenbuch, Warburg Institute, University of London, 1993.
- 1996: Julian Gardner, Serena Romano, Maria Andaloro, Alessandro Tomei, Patrizia Tosini, Gianluigi Colalucci, Bruno Zanardi, Sancta Sanctorum, Editrice Electa, Milan, 1996.
- 1997: Aldo Nestori, Il Mausoleo e il Sarcofago di Flavius Iulius Catervius a Tolentino, Pontificio Istituto di Archeologia Cristiana, Città del Vaticano.
- 1998: Brigitte Kuhn Forte, Die Kirchen Innerhalb der Mauern Roms, Oesterreichische Akademie der Wissenshaften, with Louise Rice, The Altars and Altarpieces of new St. Peter's. Outfitting the Basilica. 1621-1666, Cambridge University Press, 1997, and with Pierluigi Leone de Castris, Pittura del Cinquecento a Napoli, Electa, Naples, 1996.
- 1999: Cristina Acidini Luchinat, Taddeo e Federico Zuccari fratelli pittori del Cinquecento, Jandi Sapi Editori, Rome, 1998.
- 2000: Carmen C. Bambach, Drawing and Painting in the Italian Renaissance Workshop. Theory and Practice, 1300 - 1600, Cambridge University Press, 1999, with Oreste Ferrari, Serenita Papaldo, Le Sculture del Seicento a Roma, Ugo Bozzi Editore, Roma, 1999, and with' Anna Ottani Cavina, Felice Giani e la cultura di fine secolo 1758 - 1823, Electa, Milan, 1999.
- 2001: Olga Raggio and Antoine M. Wilmering The Gubbio Studiolo and Its Conservation (2000) ISBN 0-300-08516-8
- 2002: Tracy Ehrlich, Landscape and Identity in Early Modern Rome: Villa Culture at Frascati in the Borghese Era, Cambridge University Press, 2002.
- 2003:
- 2004: Riccardo Spinelli, Giovan Battista Foggini, Edifir Edizioni, Florence, 2003.
- 2005: Matteo Ceriana, Keith Christiansen, Emanuela Daffra and Andrea de Marchi, Frà Carnevale. Un artista rinascimentale da Filippo Lippi e Piero della Francesca, Edizioni Olivares, Milan, 2004.
- 2006: Eckhard Leuschner, Antonio Tempesta: Ein Bahnbrecher des römischen Barock und seine europäische Wirkung, Michael Imhof Verlag, Petersberg, 2005.
- 2007: Gabriele Barucca and Jennifer Montagu, Ori e argenti. Capolavori del 700 da Arrighi a Valadier, Skira Editore 2007.
- 2008: Edouard Pommier, L'invenzione dell'arte nel Rinascimento, Giulio Einaudi Editore, Turin 2007.
- 2009: Anna Ambrosini Massari, Dotti amici. Amico Ricci e la nascita della storia dell'arte nelle Marche, Ancona 2008, with Andrea De Marchi and Matteo Mazzalupi, Pittori ad Ancona nel Quattrocento, Federico Motta, Milan 2008.
- 2010: Nicole Hegener, DIVI IACOBI EQVES. Selbstdarstellung im Werk des Florentiner Bildhauers Baccio Bandinelli, Munich, Deutscher Kunstverlag, 2008, with Clare Robertson, The Invention of Annibale Carracci, Cinisello Balsamo, Silvana, 2008.
- 2011: Claudio Pizzorusso and Alessandra Giannotti, Federico Barocci 1535 - 1612. L’ incanto del colore; una lezione per due secoli, Cinisello Balsamo, Silvana, 2009.
- 2012: Victoria Avery, Vulcan's Forge in Venus' City: The Story of Bronze in Venice, 1350-1650, London, Oxford University Press, 2011.
- 2013: Laura Paola Gnaccolini, Il segreto dei segreti: i tarocchi Sola Busca e la cultura ermetica fra le Marche e il Veneto alla fine del Quattrocento, Milano, Skira, 2012.
- 2014: Cecilia Martelli, Bartolomeo della Gatta pittore e miniatore tra Arezzo, Roma e Urbino, Florence, Centro Di, 2013.

== See also ==
- List of European art awards
