= Tim Knox =

British art historian and museum director (born 1962)

Timothy Aidan John Knox, CVO FSA (born 9 August 1962) is a British art historian and museum director. Since March 2018, he has been Director of the Royal Collection, the private art collection of the British royal family. The Royal Collection, held in trust by The King for his successors and the nation, comprises almost all aspects of the fine and decorative arts, runs to more than a million objects, and is housed across some 15 present and former royal residences across the UK. From 2013 to 2018, he was the Director of the Fitzwilliam Museum at the University of Cambridge.

== Biography ==
Tim Knox was educated at Ratcliffe College, Leicestershire, and took a BA at the Courtauld Institute of Art. In 1989 he was appointed Assistant Curator at the Royal Institute of British Architects Drawings Collection. In 1995, he joined the National Trust as its Architectural Historian and in 2002 became that organisation's Head Curator. Among the projects with which he was involved were the restoration of the gardens of Stowe House, the acquisition of Tyntesfield in Somerset and of the Workhouse in Southwell, Nottinghamshire, and the restoration of the Darnley Mausoleum in Cobham Park, Kent.

From 2005 to 2013, he was Director of Sir John Soane's Museum in London, where he oversaw a restoration project of Nos. 12 and 14 Lincoln's Inn Fields, the two houses flanking the original house-museum created by the Georgian architect Sir John Soane. Since 2009 he has been a member of the editorial board of the Georgian Group. He has been Vice-Patron of the Public Monuments and Sculpture Association since 2012.

From 2013 to 2018, he was the Director of the Fitzwilliam Museum at the University of Cambridge and a Fellow of Gonville and Caius College, Cambridge.

In January 2018, it was announced that he would be the next Director of the Royal Collection: he took up the position in March 2018 thereby joining the staff of the Royal Household. In this role, he took part in the 2023 Coronation.

Knox was appointed a Commander of the Royal Victorian Order (CVO) in the 2025 Birthday Honours.
