= Cupid Untying the Zone of Venus =

1784 painting by Sir Joshua Reynolds

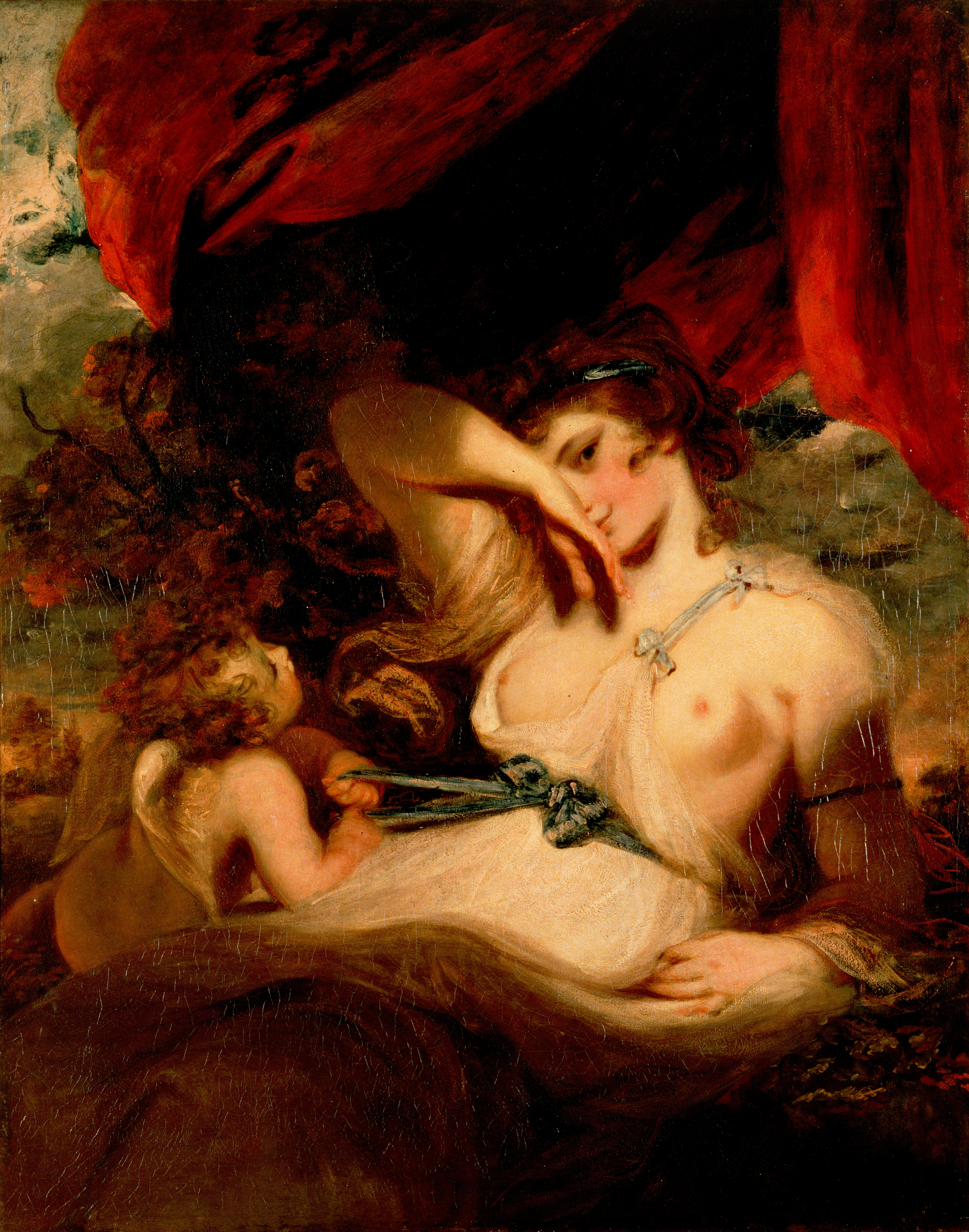
- The Hermitage copy.
- Artist: Joshua Reynolds
- Year: 1784 (copies 1785 and 1788)
- Medium: oil on canvas
- Location: Tate Britain (copies in Soane Museum and Hermitage Museum)

Cupid Untying the Zone of Venus (originally entitled A Nymph and Cupid: 'The Snake in the Grass' or The Snake in the Grass, or Love unloosing the zone of Beauty; later also known as Love and Beauty and Cupid Untying the Girdle of Venus) is a painting by Joshua Reynolds. It shows Cupid untying the girdle of his mother Venus – the latter was modelled on Emma Hart.

== Provenance ==
The earliest version was that exhibited in 1784 and bought by the Tate Gallery in 1871. A 1785 autograph copy made for Reynolds' niece the Marchioness of Thomond was bought at the sale of her collection in May 1821 by Sir John Soane – it is thus now in the Soane Museum. In 1788, Lord Carysfort commissioned an autograph copy to present to Prince Grigory Potemkin, which is now in the Hermitage Museum in Saint Petersburg.
