= China Practical Shooting Association =

- 中国实用射击总会
- Formation: 2007
- Chairman: 李杰、关铁军、邓锦添
- Parent organization: International Practical Shooting Confederation
- Website: ipscchina.org

China Practical Shooting Association (CPSA) (Chinese 中国实用射击总会) is the Mainland China region for practical shooting under the International Practical Shooting Confederation.

== See also ==
- IPSC Action Air
