= Vertical disintegration =

Vertical disintegration refers to a specific organizational form of industrial production. As opposed to vertical integration, in which production occurs within a singular organization, vertical disintegration means that various diseconomies of scale or scope have broken a production process into separate companies, each performing a limited subset of activities required to create a finished product.

Filmed entertainment was once highly vertically integrated into a studio system whereby a few large studios handled everything from production to theatrical presentation. After the second world war, the industry was broken into small fragments, each specializing on particular tasks within the division of labor required to produce and show a finished piece of filmed entertainment. Hollywood became highly vertically disintegrated, with specialized firms who only performed certain tasks such as editing, special effects, trailers etc. Bell System divestiture had a similar effect on a larger industry later in the 20th century.

One major reason for vertical disintegration is to share risk. Also, in some cases, smaller firms can be more responsive to changes in market conditions. Vertical disintegration is thus more likely when operating in volatile markets. Stability and standardized products more typically engender integration, as it provides the benefits of scale economies.

The geography of a disintegrated industry is not a given. Economic geographers typically differentiate between knowledge-intensive, volatile, unstandardized activities, and standardized, routinized production. The former tend to be clustered in space, as they require proximity to build a common conceptual framework and share new ideas. The latter can be far flung and are exemplified by global commodity chains such as apparel and automotive industries. Even in those industries however, design and other creative and non-repetitive tasks tend to exhibit some geographical clustering.

== See also ==
- Outsourcing
- Core competency
