= Frédéric Ogée =

French historian

Frédéric Ogée is Emeritus Professor of British Literature and Art History at Université Paris Cité and Ecole du Louvre. His main period of research is the long 18th-century, and his publications include two collections of essays on William Hogarth, as well as ‘Better in France’? The circulation of ideas across the Channel in the 18th century (Bucknell, 2005), Diderot and European Culture (Oxford, 2006; repr.2009), J.M.W. Turner, Les Paysages absolus (Paris, 2010) and Jardins et Civilisations (Valenciennes, 2019), following a conference at the European Institute for Gardens and Landscapes in Caen. In 2006-07, he curated the first-ever exhibition of Hogarth for the Louvre Museum. He is currently working on a series of four large monographs in French on 18th- and 19th-century British artists. The first one, Thomas Lawrence--Le genie du portrait anglais came out in December 2022. The second one, on the landscape artist J.M.W.Turner, will be published early 2026. From 2014 to 2017 he was a member of Tate Britain’s Advisory Council in London, and from 2014 to 2021 a member of the City of Paris Scientific Council. In 2018-19 he was Kress Fellow in the Literature of Art at the Clark Art Institute and then the William Allan Neilson Professor at Smith College, both in Massachusetts, USA. Since October 2025 he has been appointed for 3 years as a member of the Advisory Council of the Paul Mellon Centre for Studies in British Art in London, and in February 2026, he will give the Lewis Walpole Library Annual Lecture at the Yale University Art Gallery..

== Education and Professional Experience ==
- - Professor at Ecole du Louvre, Paris, 2023-2026.
- - Professor of British Literature and Art History, English Dept. Université Paris Cité, 1995-2025.
- - Professor at SciencesPo Paris, 12-week courses on British art, Fall Term 2013, 2014, 2016, 2017.
- - Associate Professor, English Dept. Université Paris X Nanterre (1984-1995)
- - PhD in English Literature (December 1984), Doctoral Supervisor: Professor Claude Bruneteau,

Université de Paris X - Nanterre. Topic : Henry Fielding et l'esthétique : contribution à l'analyse des trois romans de Henry Fielding à la lumière de l'Analyse de la Beauté de William Hogarth. Highest Distinction (Très bien à l'unanimité du jury).

- - Agrégation d'Anglais (National Exam) – English Literature Major
- - French Lector and Teaching Instructor, University of Cambridge (UK), Gonville & Caius College (1978-80)
- - Ecole Normale Supérieure de Saint-Cloud (1977-1982)

== Institutional Responsibilities, Senior Management Experience ==
- - Member of the Paul Mellon Centre for Studies in British Art Advisory Council in London, 2025-2028
- - Member of the City of Paris Research Council (Conseil scientifique de la Ville de Paris), 2014-21
- - Member of Editorial Board of «18th-Century Worlds publication series », Liverpool University

Press, since 2011.

- - Member of Tate Britain Advisory Council, Tate Britain Museum, London, 2014-2017.
- - President of the English Department’s Research Council, 1996-2001
- - Elected member of Université Paris 7 / Paris Diderot Research Council, 2001-2006
- - Vice President for International Relations, Université Paris Diderot/now Paris Cité , 2006-2018

Creation and Management of an International Office  development of student exchange programs with above 120 partner universities across the world,  setting up of research collaborations and joint research laboratories in Asia (China, Japan, South Korea, Vietnam), South America (Argentina, Brazil), the Middle East and Africa (Egypt, Israel, The Lebanon, Morocco, Turkey, The United Arab Emirates), North America (Amherst, Berkeley, Duke, Montreal, NYU, Smith College, UCLA, etc.) and Europe (Amsterdam, Berlin, Bologna, Edinburgh, Graz, Heidelberg, London, Rome, Warsaw, etc.)  main disciplines concerned: genetics, immunology, rheumatology, psychoanalysis, astrophysics, chemistry, earth sciences, geography, history, Chinese studies, Vietnamese studies, Korean studies, Anglophone studies, French literature and cinema

- - Elected Member of the English Department’s Steering Committee, 2023-2026

== Selected publications ==
- Thomas Lawrence, Le génie du portrait anglais, Paris, Cohen & Cohen, 2022.
- Jardins et Civilisations, in collaboration with Aurélie Godet, Collection “Jardins et sociétés” Valenciennes, Presses Universitaires de Valenciennes, 2018.
- Sensing the World- Taste and the senses in the Eighteenth Century (II), Trier: Wissenschaftlicher Verlag, 2017.
- Intellectual journeys: the translation of ideas in Enlightenment England, France and Ireland, co-edited with Lise Andries, Darach Sanfey et John Dunkley Volume: SVEC 2013:12. Oxford, Voltaire Foundation, 2013.
- Jonathan Swift, Voyage à Lilliput, New translation, Preface and Notes, Paris: Hachette, 2012.
- The Definition of Colour, a collection of essays, Interfaces 33, 2012.
- Taste and the senses in the Eighteenth century (I), co-edited with Peter Wagner, Trier: Wissenschaftlicher Verlag, 2012.
- Grammaire appliquée de l'anglais, 4ème édition revue et corrigée, in collaboration with Paul Boucher (Université de Nantes). Paris: Armand Colin, 2017
- J.M.W. Turner. Les paysages absolus. Paris : Hazan, 2010, 400p.
- William Gilpin, Observations on the River Wye, &tc., a critical edition, Presses Universitaires de Pau, 2009. First French annotated edition.
- Ossian then and now, a collection of essays, Interfaces 27, 2008.
- Jonathan Richardson : Traité sur la peinture, etc., a critical edition, in collaboration with Isabelle Baudino. Paris: Ecole Nationale Supérieure des Beaux-Arts, 2008. First French edition.
- Ruins and Sketches in the Enlightenment, co-edited with Peter Wagner, Trier: Wissenschaftlicher Verlag, 2008.
- Diderot and European Culture, a collection of essays, co-edited with Anthony Strugnell, Studies on Voltaire and the Eighteenth Century. Oxford: The Voltaire Foundation, 2006. Repr.2009.
- Representation and Performance in the Eighteenth Century, co-edited with Peter Wagner, Trier: Wissenschaftlicher Verlag, 2006.
- ‘Better in France? The circulation of ideas across the Channel in the 18th century, Lewisburg: Bucknell University Press, 2005.
- Art & Nation: la fondation de la Royal Academy of Arts, 1768-1836, in collaboration with Isabelle Baudino and Jacques Carré, Paris: Armand Colin, 2004.
- William Hogarth : Representing Nature's Machines. Co-edited with David Bindman (University College London) and Peter Wagner (Universität Landau). Manchester: Manchester University Press, 2001.
- The Dumb Show: Image and Society in the Works of William Hogarth. A Collection of essays, in Studies on Voltaire and the Eighteenth Century. Oxford: The Voltaire Foundation, 1997. Repr.2016.

=== Forthcoming ===
- J.M.W. Turner, Paris, Cohen & Cohen, 2026
- Thomas Gainsborough, Paris, Cohen & Cohen, 2027
- William Hogarth, Paris, Cohen & Cohen, 2028

== Videos and podcasts ==
- - J.M.W. Turner (1775-1851) : Le pouvoir du paysage --> https://www.youtube.com/watch?v=In-4p-5XKVs
- - L'art du portrait en Angleterre, de William Hogarth à Thomas Lawrence :

https://www.canal-u.tv/chaines/ut2j/l-art-du-portrait-en-angleterre-de-william-hogarth-a-thomas-lawrence

- - https://www.youtube.com/watch?v=PPuyh8fUgLQ&feature=youtu.be&list=PLLYuYwU8AsaO24-3IVyFZjrZha8dxnUo9
- - Jardin et paysage : https://www.youtube.com/watch?v=V0mG3YL9GXg
- - Jane Austen & Northanger Abbey : https://www.radiofrance.fr/franceculture/podcasts/les-chemins-de-la-philosophie/les-chemins-de-la-philosophie-du-mercredi-20-avril-2022-7800424
