= Canadian Professional Sales Association =

Canadian professional association

Canadian Professional Sales Association (CPSA)
- Industry: Professional association
- Founded: 1874
- Headquarters: Toronto, Ontario, Canada
- Products: Membership savings and professional development
- Website: www.cspa.com

The Canadian Professional Sales Association, commonly known as CPSA, was a Canadian association for sales professionals. CPSA was a not-for-profit association with over 10,000 members. Prior to its operational wind-down at the end of 2024, CPSA offered professional sales designations, sales training and a membership cost-savings program.

== History ==
The Canadian Professional Sales Association was established in 1874 as the Commercial Travellers Association (CTA). The association's mission was stated as the "moral, intellectual, and financial improvement and advancement and welfare of its members."

The founding members were business leaders including first president Warring Kennedy who went on to be the mayor of Toronto in the mid-1890s.

Travel benefits and insurance programs were the driving forces behind membership. And the influence of the founding members attracted Prime Ministers and Cabinet members to the annual "networking" events, the Travellers' Dinners and Banquets. As for travel benefits, commercial rates were extended by the railway hotels, members received 2 cents off per mile and free sample trunk privileges from the railways and by the 1940s discounts were extended on air travel on Trans-Canada Air Lines or CP Air.

There was tremendous growth in the six regional Travellers Associations until the late 1950s when the air discounts were eliminated. Major membership declines were experienced by all associations and led to the merger of three [CTA, "Ontario" CTA and "Dominion" CTA] of the six. A national organization formed under the CTA name, with 20,000 combined members, $20,000,000 in financial resources and a staff of 8-10.

Between 1988 and 1989, the CTA underwent major organizational changes. The association reorganized its internal structure to focus on four major pillars; education (now referred to as training and professional development), communications, member cost-savings benefits, and information services (now known as the Learning Hub). After restructuring, CTA re-evaluated its public image and changed its name to the Canadian Professional Sales Association.

The Professional Development Department was charged with educating members through workshops, classes, publications and seminars; membership savings increased and improved member benefits; the communications department concentrated on developing public recognition and awareness of CPSA; the Sales Resource Centre was responsible for being a source for Canadian sales and sales management information.

On November 8, 2024, the CPSA board and executive leadership announced that the organization will be winding down operations; closing entirely by the end of 2024.

== Professional Development ==
Prior to its closure at the end of 2024, CPSA provided Professional Development (training) courses to sales professionals. The Professional Development Department was charged with organizing, promoting, and executing all in-class and online training, workshops, webinars, and educational events.

== CPSA Sales Institute and Sales Certification ==
Prior to its closure in 2024, the Sales Institute was established by CPSA to enhance the credibility of the sales profession by setting professional standards and sales certification.

Prior to its closure in 2024, the CPSA Sales Institute was the administrator of the Certified Sales Associate (CSA), Certified Sales Professional (CSP) and Certified Sales Leader (CSL) designations which recognize sales professionals for their selling skills and commitment to ethical standards. Prior to its closure, CPSA confirmed that all valid designation holders will retain their credentials indefinitely, recognizing the achievements of these individuals, and their commitment to professional sales excellence.
