= The Center for Palladian Studies in America, Inc. =

The Center for Palladian Studies in America, Inc. (CPSA) engages in research and other activities relating to the work of architect Andrea Palladio. CPSA was founded as a national non-profit membership corporation in Charlottesville, Virginia, in 1979.

Andrea Palladio (1508–1580) is often referred to as the most influential architect in history. He designed country villas, urban palaces, churches and bridges in the Veneto region of Italy in the late Renaissance period. Palladio's greatest impact arose from publication (Venice, 1570) of his treatise entitled I quattro libri dell'architettura (The Four Books on Architecture).

Palladiana: Journal of the Center for Palladian Studies in America, Inc., is published semi-annually. The Center's books include the 3-volume Building by the Book series edited by Mario di Valmarana and Palladio and America: Selected Papers Presented to the Centro Internazionale di Studi di Architettura (1997), edited by Christopher Weeks. Grants have supported publication of Douglas Lewis’ The Drawings of Andrea Palladio (2nd ed., 2000) and Bryan Clark Green’s In Jefferson’s Shadow: The Architecture of Thomas R. Blackburn (2006). Other grants supported creation of the Mario di Valmarana Professorship in the University of Virginia School of Architecture and a National Register Report on Battersea, the important 1768 Palladian-style house in Petersburg, Virginia.
