= Belzoni =

Belzoni may refer to:

== People ==
- Giovanni Belzoni (1778–1823), sometimes known as The Great Belzoni, a prolific Italian explorer and pioneer archaeologist of Egyptian antiquities
- Sarah Belzoni (1783–1870), British traveller and author

== Places ==
- Belzoni, Mississippi
- Belzoni, Oklahoma

== See also ==
- 58417 Belzoni, minor planet
