= Nebmaatre (disambiguation) =

Nebmaatre (Ancient Egyptian: Nb mꜣˁt rˁ, literally "the Lord of Truth is Ra" or "Possessor of the Maat of Ra") was the throne name and only known name of an Ancient Egyptian ruler during the Second Intermediate Period.

Other uses of Nebmaatre:

- Nebmaatre (prince), a prince and High Priest of Ra during the Twentieth Dynasty
- Other monarchs with the throne name Nebmaatre:
  - Amenhotep III of the Egyptian New Kingdom
  - Amanitenmemide of Nubia
