= Tatenen =

Ancient Egyptian deity of the primordial mound

- Ptah-Tatenen, the androgynous personification of the primordial mound of Benben (a modern rendition based on depictions from antiquity).
Name in hieroglyphs
tA N23 Z1 T M22 M22 C18
- Major cult center: Memphis
- Offspring: the Ogdoad (some accounts)

Tatenen (also Ta-tenen, Tatjenen, Tathenen, Tanen, Tenen, Tanenu, and Tanuu) was the deity of the primordial mound in ancient Egyptian religion. His name means "risen land" or "exalted earth", as well as referring to the silt of the Nile. As a primeval chthonic deity, Tatenen was identified with creation. Both feminine and masculine, he was an androgynous protector of nature from the Memphis area (then known as Men-nefer), the ancient capital of the Inebu-hedj nome in Lower Egypt.

Tatenen represented the Earth and was born in the moment it rose from the watery chaos, analogous to the primeval mound of the benben and mastaba and the later pyramids. He was seen as the source of "food and viands, divine offers, all good things", as his realms were the deep regions beneath the earth "from which everything emerges", specifically including plants, vegetables, and minerals. In the Third Intermediate Period hymn, The Great Hymn of Khnum, he is identified with the creator god Khnum, who created "all that is" on his potter's wheel. This fortuity granted him the titles of both "creator and mother who gave birth to all gods" and "father of all the gods". He also personified Egypt (due to his associations with rebirth and the Nile) and was an aspect of the earth-god Geb, as a source of artistic inspiration, as well as assisting the dead in their journey to the afterlife.

He is first attested in the inscriptions that mostly appear on coffins during the First Intermediate Period and Middle Kingdom. In those inscriptions his name appears as Tanenu or Tanuu, 'the inert land', a name which characterizes him as a deity of the primeval condition of the earth. Middle Kingdom texts provide the first examples of the form Tatenen.

With a staff, Tatenen repelled the evil serpent Apep from the Primeval Mound. He also had a magical mace dedicated to the falcon, venerated as "The Great White of the Earth Creator". In one interpretation, Tatenen brought the Djed-pillars of stability to the country, although this is more commonly attributed to Ptah.

== Ptah-Tatenen ==
Depiction of Ptah-Tatenen-Osiris

Both Tatenen and Ptah were Memphite deities. Tatenen was the more ancient, combined in the Old Kingdom with Ptah as Ptah-Tatenen, in their capacity as creator deities. By the Nineteenth Dynasty Ptah-Tatenen is his sole form, and he is worshiped as royal creator god. Ptah-Tatenen can be seen as father of the Ogdoad of Hermopolis, the eight deities who themselves embody the primeval elements from before creation.

== Portrayal ==
Painting of Tatenen from the tomb of Mentuherkhepeshef, KV19

Tatenen's ambiguous portrayal may be a result of his being merged with Ptah. He was most commonly depicted in human form, sometimes with green skin, usually seated with a pharaonic beard, wearing either an Atef-crown (as Ptah-Sokar) or, more commonly, a pair of ram's horns surmounted by a sun disk and two tall feathers. As Tanenu or Tanuu, obviously a chthonic deity, he carried two snakes on his head. He was both feminine and masculine because of his status as a primeval, creator deity. Some depictions show Tatenen with a green complexion (face and arms), as he had connections to fertility and a chthonic association with plants.
