= Meryatum II =

Ancient Egyptian prince, High Priest of Ra

- High Priest of Re in Heliopolis
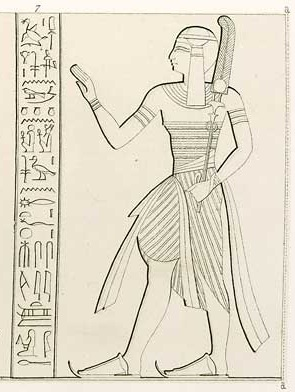
- Prince Meryatum, son of Ramesses III
- Dynasty: 20th Dynasty
- Pharaoh: Ramesses III
- Father: Ramesses III

Meryatum (“Beloved of Atum”) was an ancient Egyptian prince and High Priest of Re, the son of Pharaoh Ramesses III. Meryatum was the brother of pharaohs Ramesses IV, Ramesses VI, and Ramesses VIII. He was the uncle of pharaohs Ramesses V and Ramesses VII. His name can also be found as Ramesses Meryatum.

Meryatum is shown in the procession of royal sons depicted in Medinet Habu. He lived at least into the reigns of Ramesses IV and Ramesses V. Meryatum is mentioned in Wilbour Papyrus.

== See also ==
- Meryatum, the son of Ramesses II
