= High Priest of Ra =

Priestly title in ancient Egypt

The god Ra

The High Priest of Ra or of Re was known in Egyptian as the wr-mꜢw, which translates as Greatest of Seers.

The main cult of Ra was in ancient Heliopolis, northeast of present-day Cairo. The high priests of Ra are not as well documented as the high priests of other deities such as Amun and Ptah.

== List of high priests ==
Old Kingdom (c. 2686 BCE – 2181 BCE)

- Imhotep, time of Djoser, Third Dynasty
- Prince Rahotep, possibly son of Sneferu, Fourth Dynasty

Middle Kingdom (c. 2055 BCE–1550 BCE)

- Nubkaura-ankh, from offering table and rock inscription
- Khakaureemhat, papyrus from Lahun
- Maakherure-emhutaat, seal
- Ra, seal
- Khentyhetep Iyemiatib, seal
- Iuefsenef, seal

New Kingdom (c. 1550 BCE–1069 BCE)

Eighteenth Dynasty

- Ahmose, son of Amenhotep II. Served during the reign of Thutmose IV
- Pawah served during the reign of Akhenaten
- Paraemheb served during the reign of Horemheb, and is possibly the same as Paatenemheb in his late career

Nineteenth Dynasty

- Bak (High Priest of Re) Bak was a royal charioteer and later high priest of Re.
- Amenemope, son of the high priest of Amun, Parennefer called Wennefer
- Meryatum son of Ramesses II and Nefertari
- Rahotep served as Vizier as well as high priest of Re during the reign of Ramesses II.

Twentieth Dynasty

- Meryatum II served during the Twentieth Dynasty
- Nebmaatre, likely a son of Ramesses IX

== Related archaeological elements ==
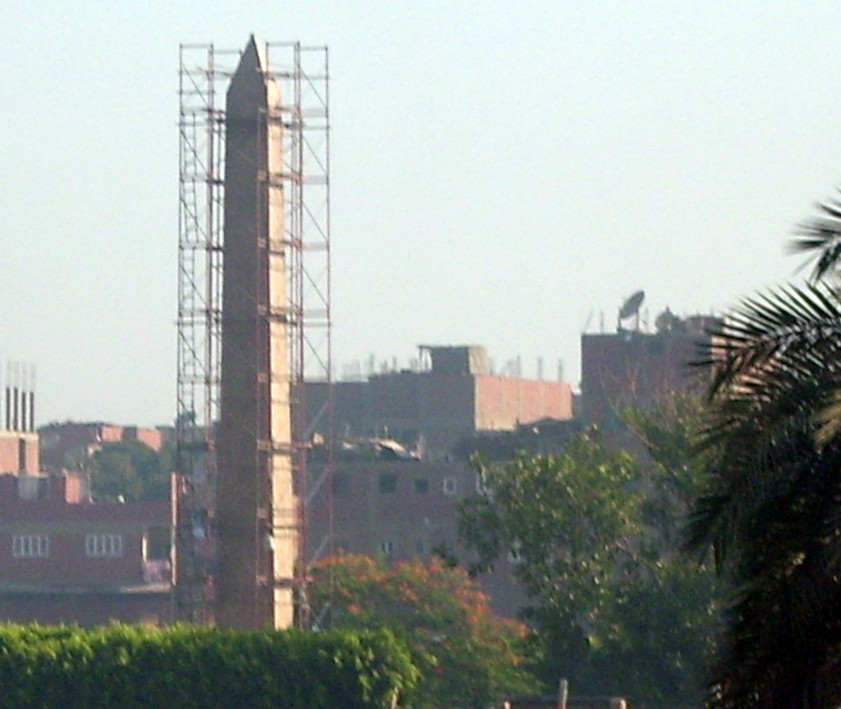
The Masalla Obelisk, at the Temple of Re—Atum site in Al-Matariyyah

The Al-Masalla area of the Al-Matariyyah district, the site of Heliopolis, contains the underground tombs of High Priests of Re of the Sixth Dynasty (2345 BCE – 2181 BCE), which were found in the southeast corner of the great Temple of Re—Atum archaeological site. The ancient Masalla Obelisk, or El-Misalla (Arabic: المسلة, trans. obelisk), in Al-Matariyyah is the only surviving element standing of the Re—Atum Temple, constructed by Pharaoh Senusret I (1971 BCE – 1926 BCE) of the Twelfth Dynasty.
