= Nebmaatre (prince) =

Ancient Egyptian prince and high priest

- High Priest of Re in Heliopolis
Egyptian name
ra nb C10
- Dynasty: 20th Dynasty
- Pharaoh: Ramesses IX
- Father: Ramesses IX

Nebmaatre (“The Lord of the Truth is Re”) was an ancient Egyptian prince and High Priest of Re in Heliopolis during the 20th Dynasty. He is likely to have been a son of Ramesses IX since they are mentioned together on a door lintel in a Heliopolis temple. He was a brother to Prince Mentuherkhepeshef; another possible brother is Pharaoh Ramesses X.

== Sources ==
- Aidan Dodson & Dyan Hilton: The Complete Royal Families of Ancient Egypt. Thames & Hudson, 2004, ISBN 0-500-05128-3, pp. 191,193
