= Ahmose (18th dynasty) =

Ancient Egyptian prince, High Priest of Ra

- High Priest of Re in Heliopolis
Egyptian name
iaH ms s
- Dynasty: 18th Dynasty
- Pharaoh: Thutmose IV
- Father: probably Amenhotep II
- Mother: probably Tiaa

Ahmose (“Child of the Moon”) was an ancient Egyptian prince and High Priest of Re during the Eighteenth Dynasty of Egypt.

== Life ==
Ahmose was probably a son of Pharaoh Amenhotep II. He was in office as High Priest of Re in Heliopolis during the reign of his brother Thutmose IV. A stela of his, which originally stood probably in Heliopolis, is now in Berlin, his broken statue (probably from Koptos) is in Cairo.
