= Belzoni, Oklahoma =

Coordinates: 34°11′08″N 95°27′56″W

Belzoni
- Inhabited area
- Interactive map of Belzoni
- Country: United States
- State: Oklahoma
- County: Pushmataha

Belzoni is a community in Pushmataha County, Oklahoma, United States. Located several miles southwest of Rattan, it was formerly home to a thriving community and continues as a place name.

Belzoni was established during the waning years of the Choctaw Nation as a sovereign entity, and was settled by white settlers from mostly Southern states. The settlement rapidly grew into a successful farming hub and population center in that area. On October 20, 1905 a United States Post Office was established at Belzoni, Indian Territory – a testament to its success.

As farming declined as a way of livelihood in Pushmataha County, so did the prospects for Belzoni's continued viability. It lost its role as population center to Rattan, and on October 31, 1954 its post office was closed.

During the 1970s the filling of the newly constructed Hugo Lake reservoir on the Kiamichi River took much of the formerly rich agricultural land south of Belzoni, and submerged a well-known local landmark along the river known as the “Belzoni Narrows.”

Belzoni is named for Giovanni Battista Belzoni, sometimes called “The Great Belzoni”, an Italian explorer and archaeologist who was well known for his role in discovering or investigating ancient Egyptian historical sites, including the Great Pyramids of Giza.

Prior to Oklahoma's statehood, Belzoni was located in Cedar County, Choctaw Nation. Cedar County was part of the Apukshunnubbee District.

== See also ==
Pushmataha County Historical Society
