= Alberto Siliotti =

Italian scientific journalist, writer and photographer

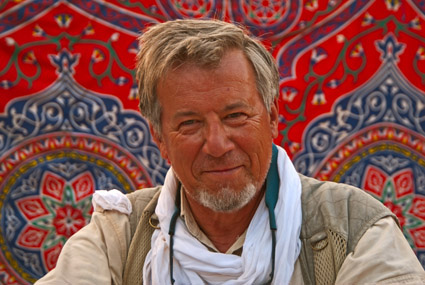
- Alberto Siliotti
- Born: 5 August 1950 (age 76); Verona, Italy
- Occupations: Scientific journalist, writer and photographer
- Website: geodia.net

Alberto Siliotti is a scientific journalist, writer and photographer. For more than 20 years, he studied history, archeology and the natural environment of Egypt, where he started to work in 1988 as the director of the Horus mission, led by the Italian ministry of foreign affairs who wanted to relate the itineraries of the Italian travelers of the 19th century – especially Giovanni Battista Belzoni who discovered the entry of Chepren pyramid and Sethi I tomb in the king valley. He has made for the British Museum, a scholarly edition of Belzoni's travels, among plenty of objects recovered in Egypt are part of the museum collections.

He led several scientific expeditions in the Egyptian Sahara for the art and the prehistorical life in the pharaohs country, and other missions into Egyptian oasis.

Member of the Egypt Exploration Society and the Egyptian Geographic Society, he is the author of about 30 books and guides translated in several languages and published by AUC Press, WhiteStar, Grund and Geodia Editions.

He made the first topographic maps of the national park of the Gilf Kebir and of the White desert.

Since 2000, he collaborated with the American University in Cairo and created the famous pocket guides collection, 14 titles in 4 languages.

Expert of the International Union for Conservation of Nature, he made the Fayoum and wadi El Rayan guide and the Gilf Kebir National Park guide for the Development cooperation of the Italian Embassy.

Passionate for the red sea, Alberto Siliotti has studied the fauna, the coral reefs and its natural environment preservation. He is the author of a red sea fish guide, a book concerning the most famous wrecks of the red sea, and the Sinai dive guide, prized in 2005 by the Underwater Film Festival of Antibes.

He is currently the director of Geodia Editions.

== Books ==
- 1994, Egypt Splendors of an Ancient Civilization, Thames and Hudson Ltd, ISBN 0-500-01647-X
- 1998, Egypt Lost and Found, Explorers and Travelers on the Nile, Thames and Hudson Ltd, ISBN 0-500-01882-0
- 2000, Dwellings of Eternity, Barnes & Nobles Books, ISBN 0-7607-2276-5
- 2000, Guide to the Pyramids of Egypt, White Star S.r.l., ISBN 88-8095-272-2
- 2001, Belzoni's Travels, The British Museum Press, ISBN 0-7141-1940-7
- 2004, Guide to the Valley of the Kings, White Star S.r.l., ISBN 88-540-0122-8
- 2008, Hidden treasures of antiquity, White Star S.r.l., ISBN 88-540-0497-9

== Egypt pocket guides ==
- 2000, Sinai (GB), The American University in Cairo Press, ISBN 977-424-597-0
- 2000, Abu Simbel and The Nubian Temples, The American University in Cairo Press, ISBN 977-424-599-7
- 2000, Islamic Cairo, The American University in Cairo Press, ISBN 977-424-598-9
- 2002, Alexandria and the North Coast, The American University in Cairo Press, ISBN 977-424-638-1
- 2002, Luxor, Karnak, and the Theban Temples, The American University in Cairo Press, ISBN 977-424-641-1
- 2002, The Pyramids, The American University in Cairo Press, ISBN 977-424-640-3
- 2002, The Valley of the Kings and the Theban Temples, The American University in Cairo Press, ISBN 977-424-596-2
- 2002, Aswan, The American University in Cairo Press, ISBN 978-977-424-642-5
- 2003, The Fayoum and Wadi el-Rayan, The American University in Cairo Press, ISBN 977-424-814-7
- 2007, The Oases, The American University in Cairo Press, ISBN 978-977-424-984-6
- 2008, Coptic Egypt, The American University in Cairo Press, ISBN 978-977-424-981-5
- 2008, Saint Catherine the Monastery and its Territory, Geodia ISBN 978-88-87177-78-7
- 2009, Gilf Kebir National Park, Geodia, ISBN 978-88-87177-84-8
- 2010, Medinet Madi Archeological Guide (edited by), Geodia, ISBN 978-88-87177-89-3

== Red Sea and Sinai ==
- 2002, Fishes of the Red Sea, Geodia, ISBN 88-87177-42-2
- 2004, The Red Sea, the coral garden, Geodia, ISBN 88-87177-55-4
- 2005, Sinai Diving Guide (ENG), Geodia, ISBN 88-87177-65-1
- 2008, The Great Shipwrecks of the Red Sea, Geodia, ISBN 88-87177-69-4

== Maps ==
- 2008, Map of the White Desert National Park, Geodia
- 2009, Map of the Gilf Kebir National Park, Geodia
- 2010, Map of the Western Desert – Oases of Egypt, Geodia, ISBN 88-87177-76-7
