= KV18 =

Ancient Egyptian tomb in the Valley of the Kings

- Burial site of Ramesses X (unused)
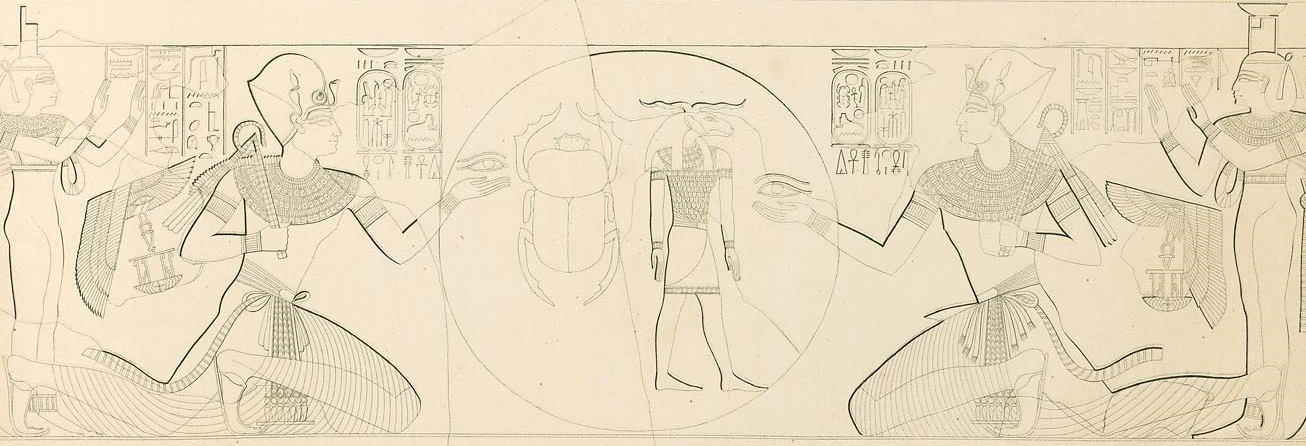
- Lintel of KV18 depicting Ramesses, accompanied by Isis and Nephthys, worshiping the morning and evening forms of Ra in a solar disc, partially reconstructed by Lepsius in his Denkmaeler

- Location within Egypt
- Coordinates: 25°44′23.1″N 32°36′07.9″E
- Location: East Valley of the Kings
- Discovered: Open in antiquity
- Excavated by: Howard Carter (1901-2); MISR: Mission Siptah-Ramses X (University of Basel) (1998-2002)
- Decoration: Lintel with solar motif; traces of deities in first corridor
- Layout: Straight axis
- ← Previous; KV17 Next → KV19

Tomb KV18, located in the Valley of the Kings in Egypt, was intended for the burial of Pharaoh Ramesses X of the Twentieth Dynasty. It was abandoned while still incomplete and never used for his burial.

The tomb consists of a large entryway with decorated lintel and two steps which lead to two sections of gently sloping corridor separated by steps and gates; the tomb ends in a stepped back wall, illustrating the quarrying method used by the workmen.

Despite its unfinished state, KV18 was partially decorated. The lintel above the entrance has a carved and painted scene of a central solar disc containing a scarab and a ram-headed god adored on both sides by kneeling figures of Ramesses X who is accompanied by the goddesses Isis and Nephthys on the left and right respectively. The door jambs preserve parts of the king's names. The first corridor has traces of decoration but the only identifiable figure is that of Ra-Horakhty on the left wall.

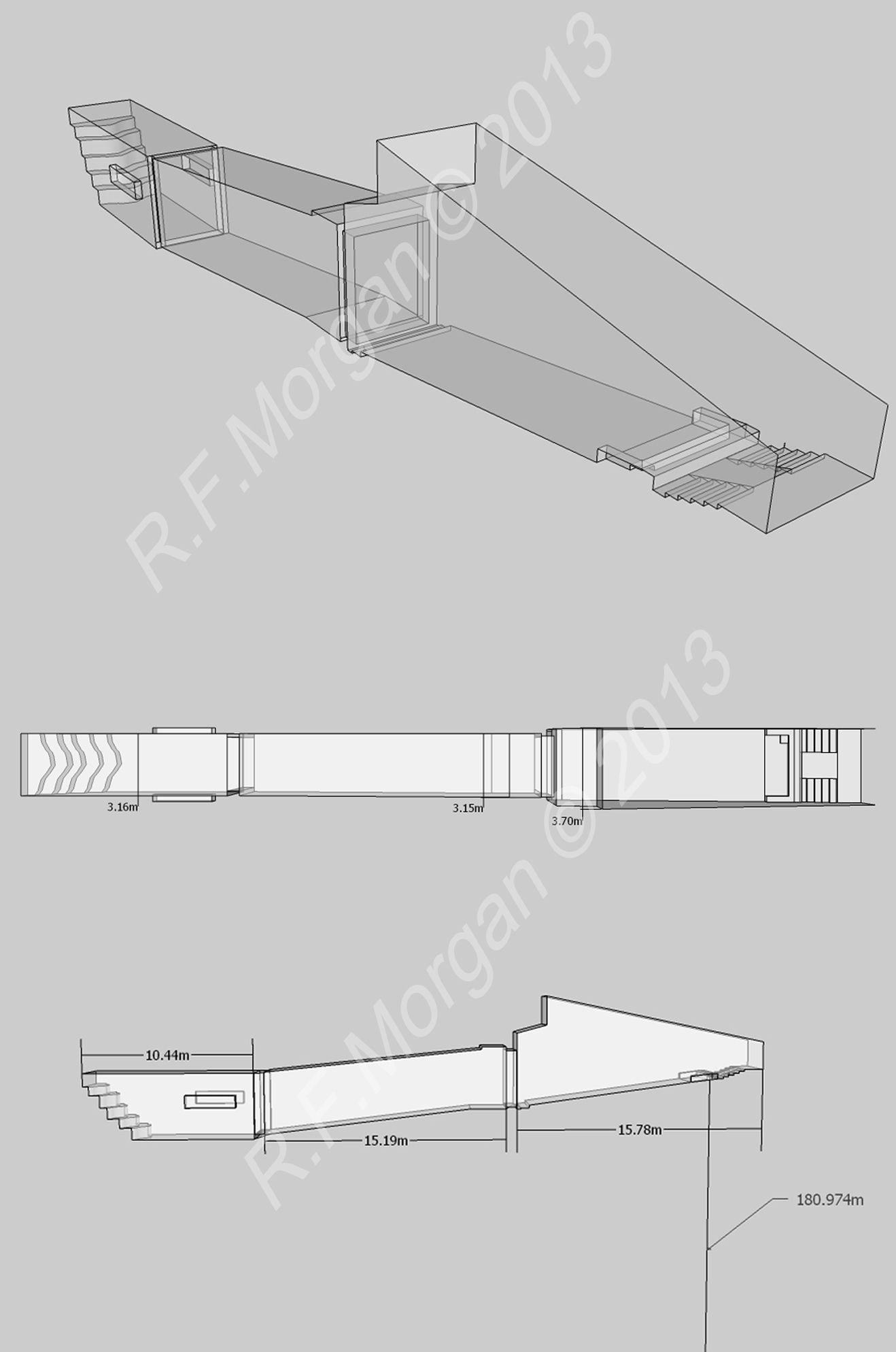
Schematic of KV18

The tomb was open in antiquity and filled with flood debris; the University of Basel's MISR: Mission Siptah-Ramesses X project counted a total of 30 layers of sediment in the second corridor. The entrance was visible in the early 19th century as the lintel decoration was copied by early Egyptologists such as Jean-François Champollion in 1826, and later by Karl Richard Lepsius.

In the late 19th and early 20th century the entryway was used by Thomas Cook & Son travel company as a place to serve their travelers lunch. In 1902 Howard Carter installed the Valley's first electricity generator in the first corridor. It was designed by M. Zimmermann and made by German company AEG. This generator provided electric lighting for six tombs: Ramesses IX, Ramesses V and VI, Ramesses III, Ramesses I, Seti I, and Amenhotep II. Between 1925 and 1936 the system was upgraded with a switchboard from Thomas Cook & Son of Cairo to allow two generators to operate simultaneously. It ran in this configuration until 1972 before being partly disassembled.

The first known excavation was conducted in the winter of 1901-2, when Carter excavated around the entrance of the tomb, discovering a partial foundation deposit consisting of model tools made of faience. Between 1998 and 2000, the University of Basel's MISR: Mission Siptah-Rameses X project conducted a full clearance of the tomb. They removed the wall built by Carter at the far end of the tomb and excavated the flood-washed fill to reveal its unfinished state. They recorded, catalogued, and partially reassembled generator components, and cleaned the walls and lintel of accumulated grime produced by the generators.
