= Mentuherkhepeshef (son of Ramesses IX) =

Ancient Egyptian prince

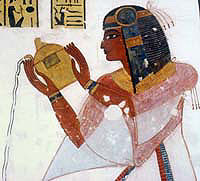
Mentuherkhepeshef as depicted in KV19

mn n V13 D2 F24 f
Mentuherkhepeshef
in hieroglyphs
Era: New Kingdom
(1550–1069 BC)

Mentuherkhepeshef was an ancient Egyptian prince of the 20th Dynasty, a son of pharaoh Ramesses IX.

His name also occurs as Ramesses-Montuherkhepeshef. He is likely to have been the brother of pharaoh Ramesses X and prince Nebmaatre. He was buried in his tomb KV19 in the Valley of the Kings, which was probably originally made for Ramesses VIII. His titles were: First King's Son of his Body; Eldest King's Son of his Body; Generalissimo; and Executive at the Head of the Two Lands.
