= Sarah Belzoni =

English traveller and writer (1783–1870)

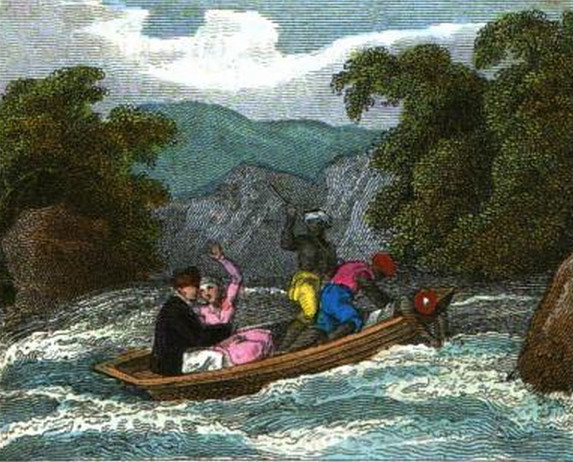
- Mr and Mrs Sarah Belzoni in a bark in the cataract
- Born: 1783; Bristol, England
- Died: 12 January 1870 (aged 86–87); Jersey
- Known for: travelling to Egypt and writing about living there
- Spouse: Giovanni Belzoni

Sarah Belzoni or Sarah Banne (January 1783 – 12 January 1870) was an English traveller and writer. She travelled notably to Egypt and wrote about women there.

== Life ==
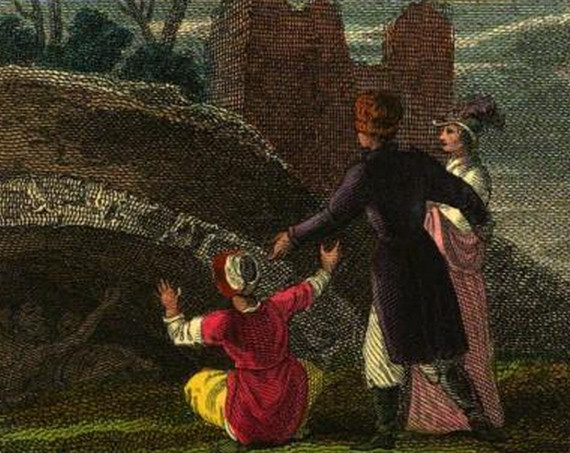
"Inhabitants of Mainarty hiding from the Belzoni party"

Sarah Banne was born in January 1783 in Bristol. She met Giovanni Belzoni and in 1812 the pair employed the Irishman, James Curtin, as a servant. In 1813 she married Belzoni and they travelled around England where her husband, who was exceptionally tall, was working as a circus strongman. In 1815 the couple travelled to Egypt.

== Egypt ==
In Egypt the two of them lived sometimes in boats and at other times in temples. Her husband would leave her alone for periods of weeks or months and she would be left to speak with the local women around her in whatever language they spoke. She spent this time documenting the lives of the local women, eventually publishing Mrs. Belzoni's trifling account of the women of Egypt, Nubia, and Syria as part of her husband's 1820 work Narrative of the Operations and Recent Discoveries … in Egypt and Nubia. Her work was the first of its kind on the topic.

In 1816, Sarah visited the chief's women at the Abu Simbel temples near Aswan. She noted that although the chief treated his women poorly, she was treated well. In her account, she noted detail of the women's lives from their possessions to their relationships. The couple returned to Luxor, where Belzoni left Sarah in an Arab house, unable to speak the language and without an interpreter. The village women crowded to look at her, going on to help her through an attack of ophthalmia.

In 1818, Sarah and Belzoni went to Jerusalem, joining the Jordan pilgrimage in May. She was fiercely independent of other European travellers, concerned that they would take credit for her actions. She was determined to enter a Muslim temple, so dressed as a man to avoid suspicion.

== Later life ==
While on an expedition in Benin in 1823, her husband died, leaving her in a difficult financial situation. She put on an exhibition of their tomb work at 28 Leicester Square, London in 1825, but it was not successful and failed to alleviate her monetary difficulties. She had to sell the haul and was left without an income. After a long campaign, her supporters eventually secured a £100 a year pension for her by 1851. Sarah Belzoni died in Jersey on 12 January 1870, and was buried there, with a simple gravestone.
