= Giovanni Belzoni =

Venetian explorer (1778–1823)

Giovanni Battista Belzoni
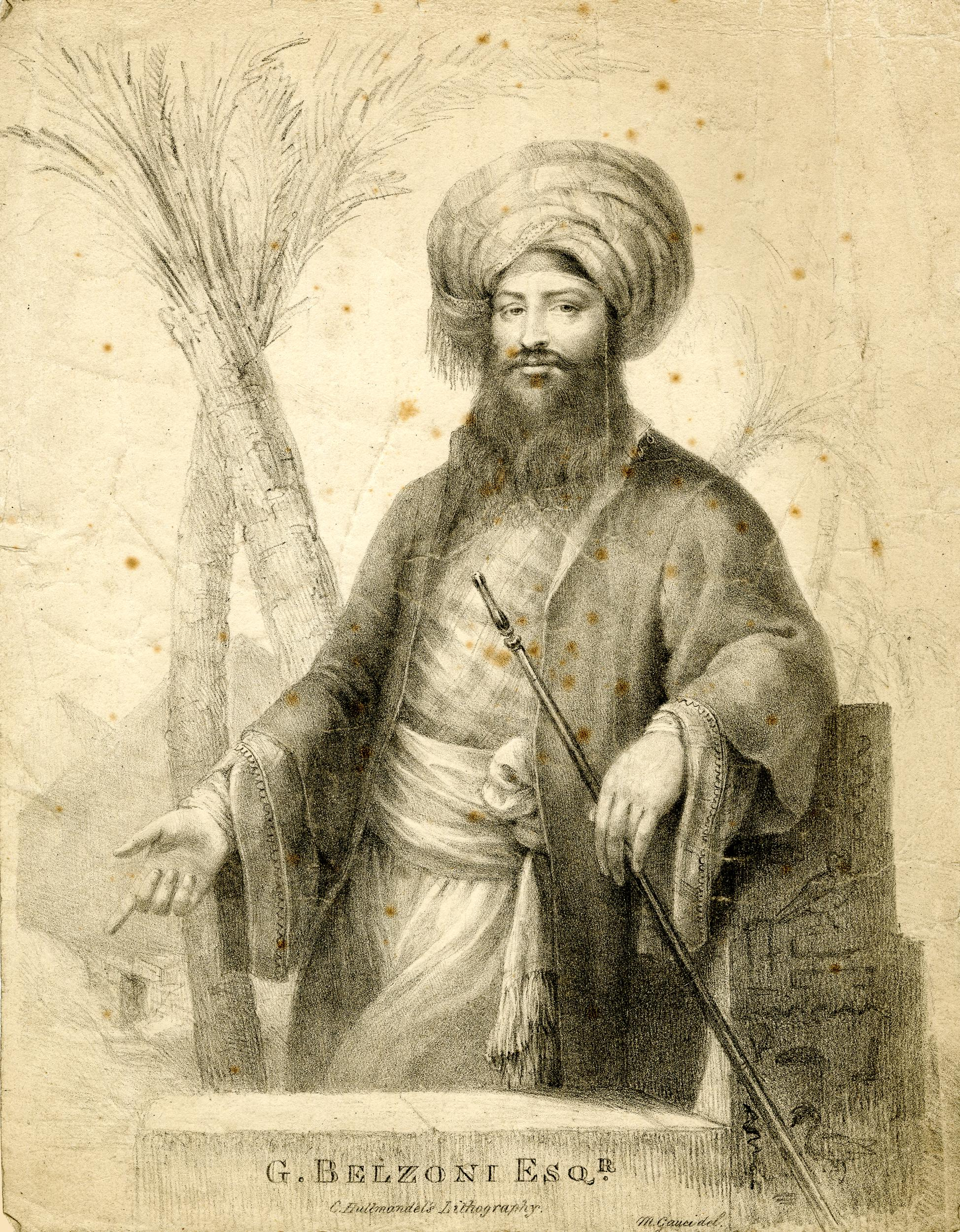
- Giovanni Battista Belzoni
- Born: 5 November 1778; Padua, Republic of Venice
- Died: 3 December 1823 (aged 45); Gwato, Kingdom of Benin (now Ughoton, Edo State, Nigeria)
- Occupations: Explorer; Pioneer archaeologist
- Known for: Removal to England of the Younger Memnon; Clearing of sand from the entrance of the great temple at Abu Simbel; Discovery and documentation of the tomb of Seti I; Discovery and opening of the main entrance to the Pyramid of Khafre
- Spouse: Sarah Banne (m. 1813)
- Scientific career
- Fields: Egyptian antiquities

Signature
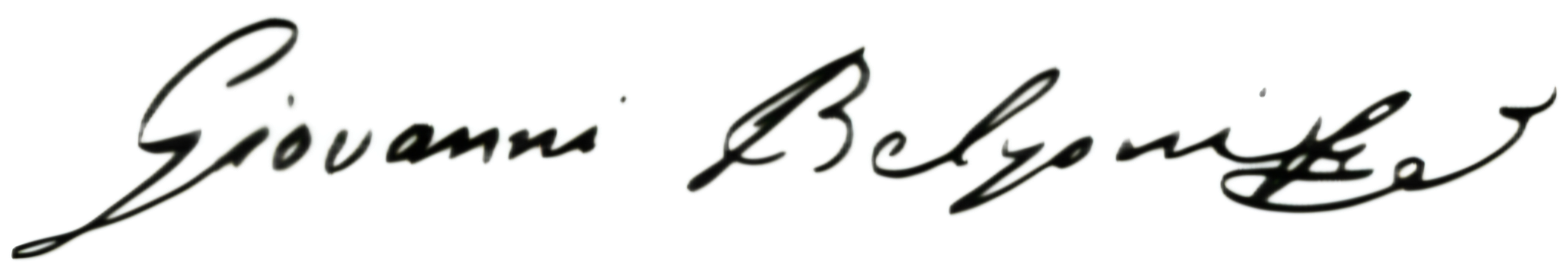

Giovanni Battista Belzoni (Italian pronunciation: [dʒoˈvanni batˈtista belˈtsoːni]; 5 November 1778 – 3 December 1823), sometimes known as The Great Belzoni, was a Venetian explorer and pioneer archaeologist of Egyptian antiquities. He is known for his removal to England of the seven-tonne bust of Ramesses II, the clearing of sand from the entrance of the great temple at Abu Simbel, the discovery and documentation of the tomb of Seti I (still sometimes known as "Belzoni's Tomb"), including the sarcophagus of Seti I. Belzoni was the first to penetrate into the Pyramid of Khafre, the second pyramid of the Giza complex, and the first European in modern times to visit the Bahariya Oasis. Howard Carter, the discoverer of the Tomb of Tutankhamun, summed up Belzoni as ‘one of the most remarkable men in the entire history of archaeology’.

== Early life ==
Belzoni was born in Padua on 5 November 1778. His father was a barber who sired fourteen children. His family was from Rome and when Belzoni was 16 he went to work there, saying that he studied hydraulics. He intended on taking monastic vows, but in 1798 the occupation of the city by French troops drove him from Rome and changed his proposed career. In 1800 he moved to the Batavian Republic (now Netherlands) where he earned a living as a barber.

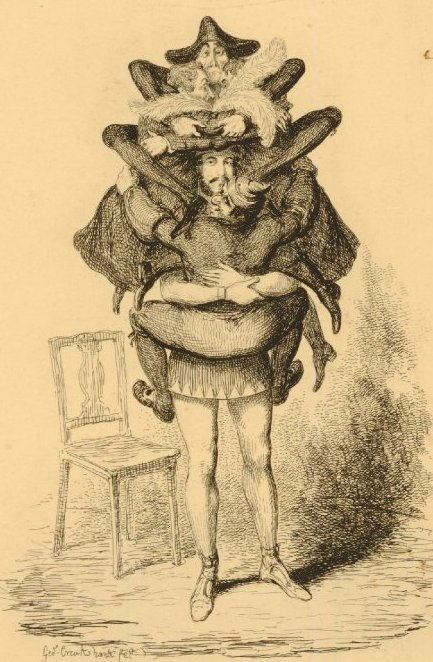
Portrait of Belzoni as a strongman

In 1803 he fled to England to avoid being sent to jail. There he married an Englishwoman, Sarah Banne. He obtained British citizenship and was initiated into a Masonic lodge, but little is known about his Masonic career. Belzoni was a tall man at 6 feet 7 inches (2.01 m) tall (one source says that his wife was of equally generous build, but all other accounts of her describe her as being of normal build) and they both joined a travelling circus. They were for some time compelled to subsist by performing exhibitions of feats of strength and agility as a strongman at fairs and on the streets of London. In 1804 he appears engaged at the circus at Astley's Amphitheatre and Sadler's Wells in a variety of performances. Belzoni had an interest in phantasmagoria and experimented with the use of magic lanterns in his shows.

== Egyptian antiquities ==
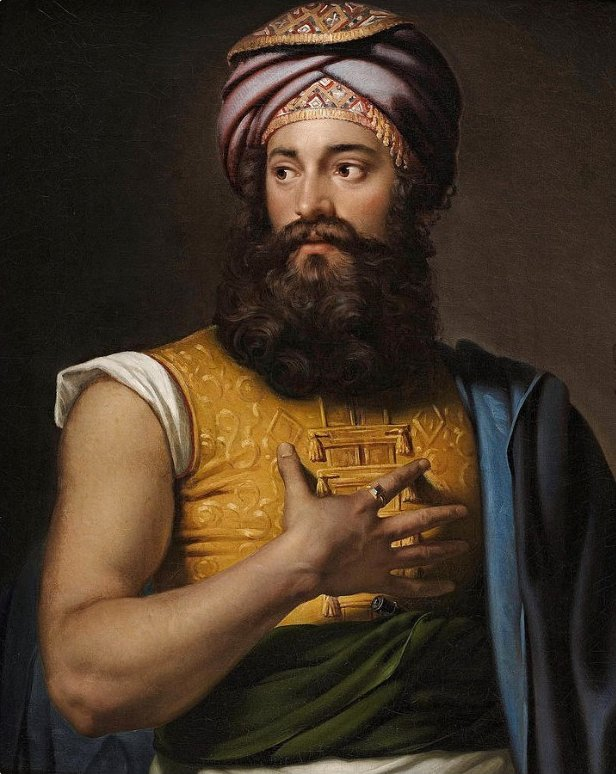
Portrait of Belzoni by Jan Adam Kruseman, 1824

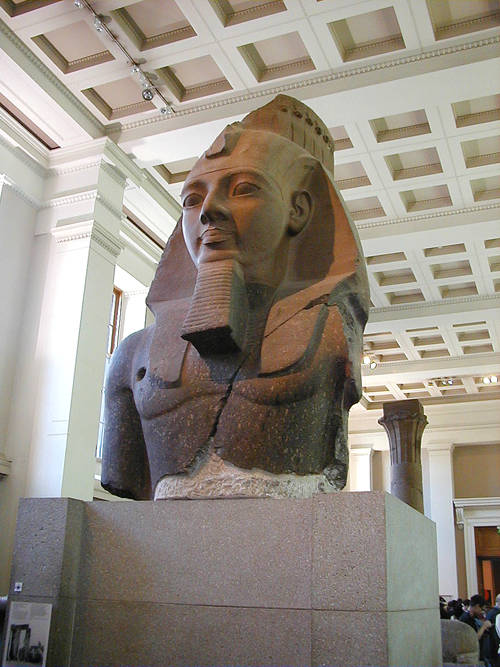
The Younger Memnon at the British Museum

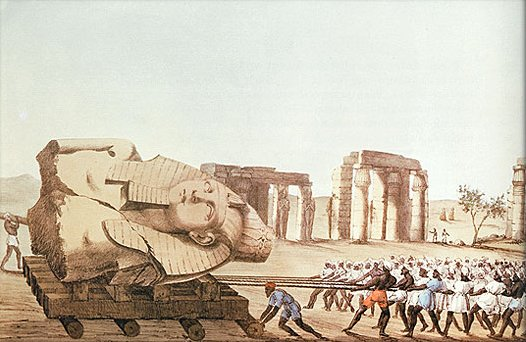
The moving of the Younger Memnon

In 1812 he left England and after a tour of performances in Spain, Portugal and Sicily, he went to Malta in 1815 where he met Ismael Gibraltar, an emissary of Muhammad Ali, the Pasha of Egypt, who at the time was undertaking a programme of agrarian land reclamation and important irrigation works. Belzoni wanted to show Muhammad Ali a hydraulic machine of his own invention for raising the waters of the Nile. He sailed to Egypt with his wife and an Irish servant, arriving in Alexandria on 9 June 1815. He then travelled to Cairo, where he finally managed to secure an audience with the pasha. Although the experiment with his engine was successful, the pasha did not approve the project. Now without a job, Belzoni was determined to continue travelling.

=== First expedition (30 June 1816-15 December 1816) ===
During his time in Cairo, Belzoni made the acquaintance of several European explorers and scholars, including the French Consul General Bernardino Drovetti, an avid collector of antiquities; the famous Swiss orientalist Johann Ludwig Burckhardt, who introduced him to Egyptology; and Giovanni Battista Caviglia, a Genoese explorer renowned for his studies and excavations of the Great Sphinx of Giza. On the recommendation of Burckhardt he was sent by Henry Salt, the British consul to Egypt, to the Ramesseum at Thebes, from where he removed with great skill the colossal bust of Ramesses II, commonly called the "Younger Memnon". Shipped by Belzoni to England, this piece is still on prominent display at the British Museum in London. This weighed over 7 tons. It took him 17 days and 130 men to tow it to the river. He used levers to lift it onto rollers. Then he had his men distributed equally with four ropes drag it on the rollers. On the first day (27 July) he covered only a few yards, but on the second he covered 50 yards, deliberately breaking the bases of two columns to clear the way for his burden. After 150 yards, it sank into the sand, and a detour of 300 yards on firmer ground was necessary. From there, it got a little easier, and, on 12 August he finally reached the river, where he was able to load it onto a boat for shipment to England. His excavation and removal of the Younger Memnon and other stones during this expedition was explicitly authorized by a firman from Muhammad Ali himself.

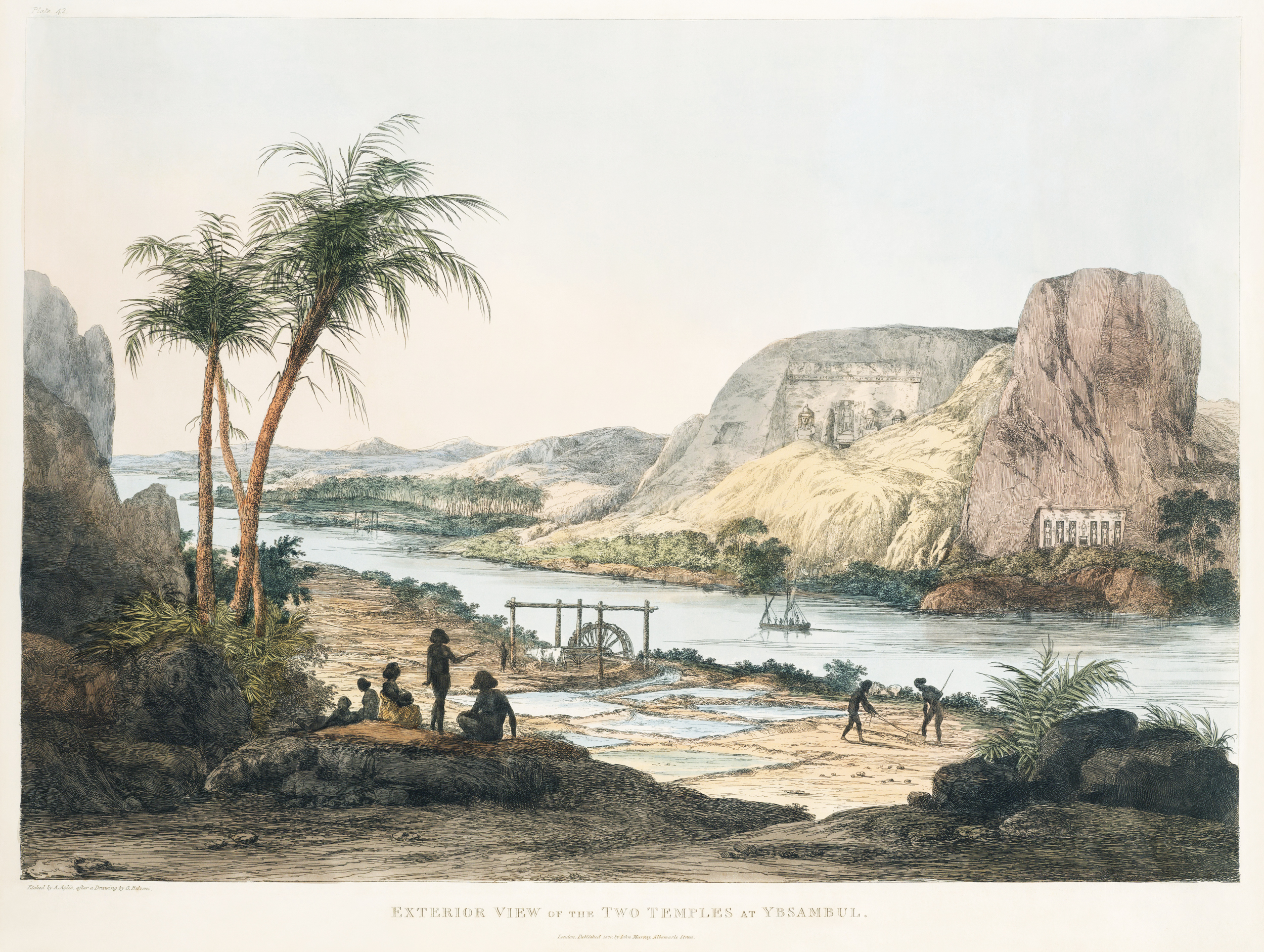
The great temple at Abu Simbel, before Belzoni cleared its entrance of sand

Before setting off for Cairo, Belzoni seized the opportunity to further his archaeological investigations in the area. He visited the Temple of Edfu and unsuccessfully attempted to gain entry to the Great Temple at Abu Simbel, which had been discovered by Burckhardt a few years earlier. Although Burckhardt had discovered the site, he was unable to enter the temple as only the tops of the four colossal heads of Ramesses II, each 20 metres high, were visible above the sand. After seven days of unsuccessful attempts, Belzoni set off for the Elephantine Island and Philae, where he took possession of an inscribed obelisk in perfect condition on behalf of the British Consulate. Before setting off with the Colossus, he returned to Luxor, where he conducted excavations at Karnak and explored the Valley of the Kings on the opposite bank of the Nile. It was here that he discovered his first tomb, which was later revealed to be that of the pharaoh Ay (WV23).

=== Second expedition (20 February 1817 - 21 December 1817) ===
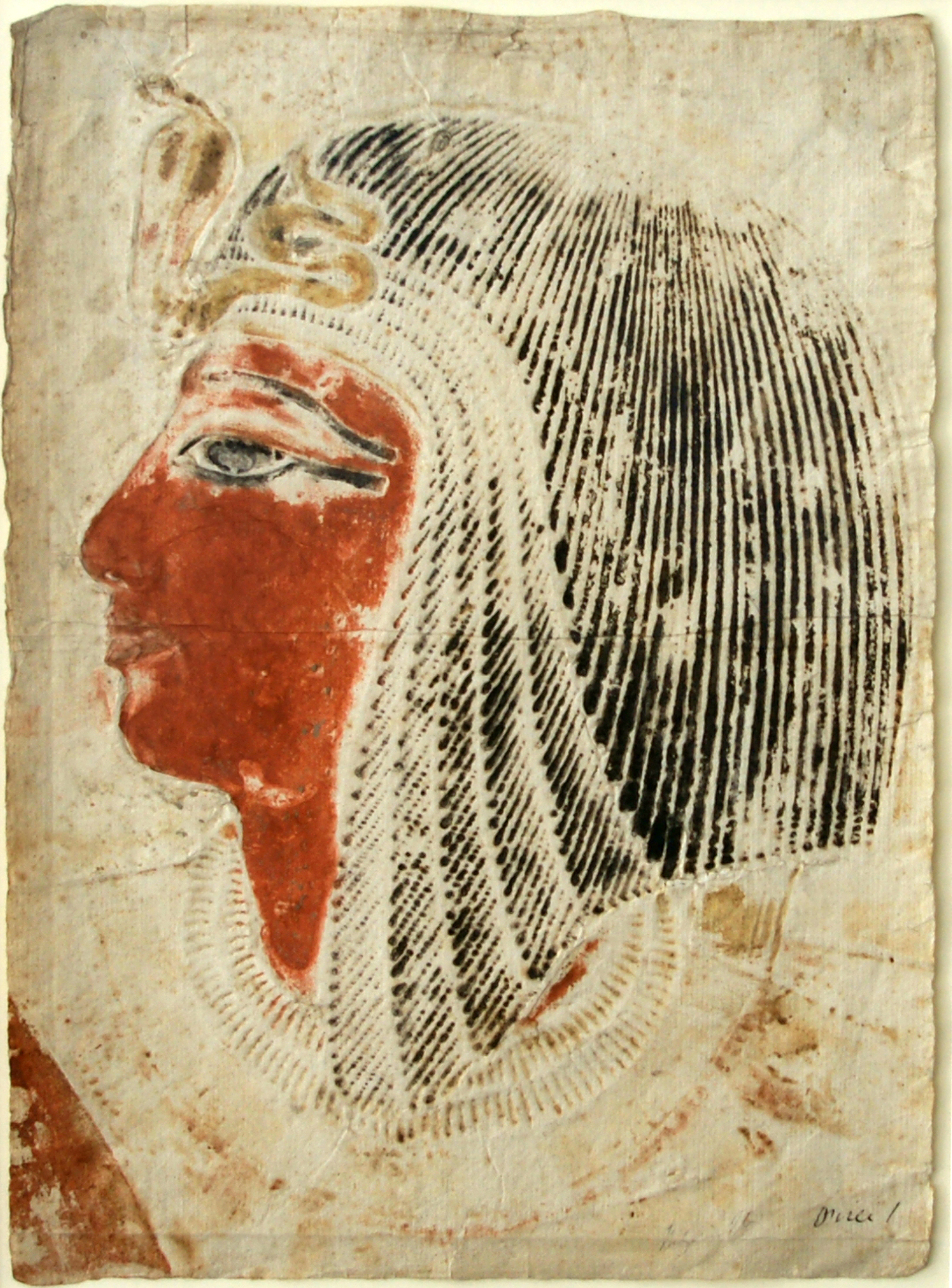
Wall rubbing of Seti I wearing a wig and the sacred uraeus, Musée d'Art classique de Mougins

Belzoni arrived in Cairo with the Colossus on 15 December 1816. In February 1817, he set out again for Karnak on Salt's behalf. His companions were Salt's secretary, Henry Beechey; two naval officers, Captains Irby and Mangles; an interpreter, Giovanni Anastasi; and a janissary, Giovanni Finati. In Karnak he unearthed a significant number of artefacts, including the sarcophagus of Pharaoh Ramesses III, a massive, highly decorated relic carved from red granite/quartzite. He also found a limestone statue of Queen Ahmose-Meritamun. He then returned to Abu Simbel, where, after 22 days of labour, he finally succeeded in clearing the entrance to the Great Temple of sand, uncovering its façade (2 August 1817). Belzoni was the first person in modern times to enter the temple. However, the discovery was disappointing because the temple had been looted centuries before. Belzoni only found a few artefacts, most importantly a falcon-headed sphinx, but he described the temple as having magnificent, pristine decorations.

He then returned to Thebes to conduct excavations in the Valley of the Kings. On 18 October 1817, he discovered the tomb of Seti I, the father of Ramesses II. Considered one of the most beautiful and intact tombs in Egypt, it is adorned with magnificent bas-reliefs and polychrome frescoes. Belzoni mapped the tomb, took a thorough inventory of its contents and created graphic casts of the bas-reliefs. The splendid, translucent alabaster sarcophagus of the pharaoh was purchased by the architect John Soane after Belzoni's death in 1824 and installed in the 'crypt' of his London house-museum, where it remains today. Belzoni carried out thorough excavations in the Valley, discovering and clearing a number of tombs, including those of Mentuherkhepeshef and Ramesses I. By the end of his expedition, he had unearthed a total of eight tombs. According to Howard Carter "this was the first occasion on which excavations on a large scale had ever been made in The Valley, and we must give Belzoni full credit for the manner in which they were carried out."

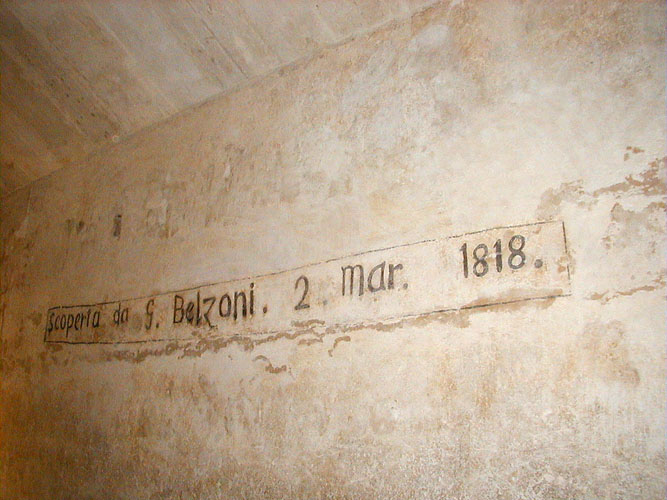
Inscription of Belzoni inside the Pyramid of Khafre

In December 1817, Belzoni returned to Cairo, where he learned of the death of Burckhardt. He had long planned to separate himself from Salt so that he could manage his work independently and enjoy the full benefits. During his brief stay, he received the necessary funds on loan and made another important discovery: the entrance to the Pyramid of Khafre, the second tallest pyramid in Giza. Belzoni's archeological methods were exceptionally refined for his time. According to Dawson when he opened the Pyramid of Khafre, the Italian archeologist showed "much more care than Vyse later used on that of Mycerinus". The discovery generated such enthusiasm in England that a bronze coin was minted in his honour, bearing his effigy on one side and the pyramid on the other.

=== Third expedition (28 April 1818-18 February 1819) ===
Soon after, Belzoni set out again, accompanied by the doctor and artist Alessandro Ricci. Ricci's illustrations of the voyage and artefacts were later exhibited at several successful exhibitions, and Belzoni included them in his travel report. Upon arriving in Thebes, Belzoni discovered that Drovetti and Salt had obtained the exclusive rights to excavate the richest archaeological sites. Although he was expelled and relegated to a lesser-known area, he was fortunate enough to find a beautiful statue of Amenhotep III. After completing the inventory and description of Seti I's tomb with Ricci, Belzoni realised that he had nothing left to do in the area, so he set off for Berenice, an ancient port on the Red Sea that had been discovered by the French mineralogist Frédéric Cailliaud a few years before. He sailed south up the Nile to Edfu and then crossed the desert. Upon reaching the location indicated by Cailliaud, Belzoni discovered that the ruins were merely the remains of an ancient mining village. Determined to find the real Berenice, he continued travelling south. Eventually, he discovered the remains of the lost city on the Ras Banas peninsula, becoming the first person to correctly identify its location. However, due to a lack of food, he was unable to carry out in-depth excavations and had to turn back.

After returning to Thebes, where he encountered the English explorer and Egyptologist William John Bankes, Belzoni set out again, this time in search of the Siwa Oasis, home to the famous Temple of the Oracle of Amun, built during the 26th Dynasty in the 6th century BCE. He crossed the Western Desert and encountered the Bahariya Oasis. He mistakenly identified this location as Siwa, but did not find the expected ancient oracle site. Despite this mistake, Belzoni is credited as the first European in modern times to visit the Bahariya Oasis.

=== Return to Europe ===
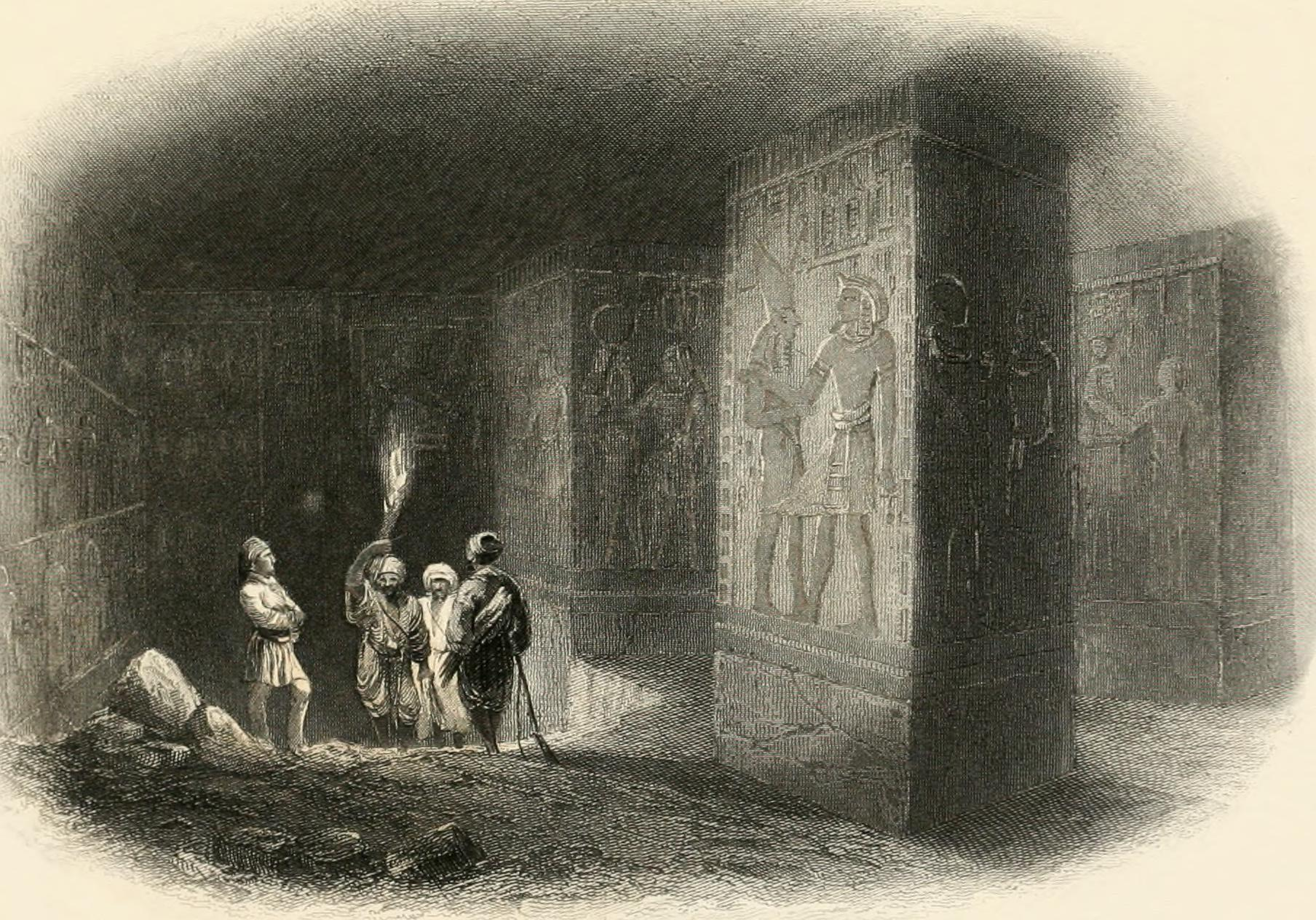
Belzoni enters the tomb of Seti I. Illustration from William Henry Bartlett's The Nile boat or, glimpses of the land of Egypt

In September 1819, Belzoni left Egypt and returned to Europe. He initially set off for Italy, reaching his native Padua in early December. The welcome he received there was enormous. News of his exploits prompted the Austrian government to bestow great honours upon him, including the minting of a commemorative medal. Belzoni donated two ancient statues depicting the goddess Sekhmet to the city, which are on display today in the Palazzo della Ragione. He befriended the neoclassical architect Giuseppe Jappelli, who was inspired by Belzoni to design the Egyptian Room in the famous Pedrocchi Café. After two months, he set sail for London, where he arrived on 31 March 1820.

Once in England, Belzoni published an account of his travels and discoveries entitled Narrative of the Operations and Recent Discoveries within the Pyramids, Temples, Tombs and Excavations in Egypt and Nubia, &c the following year. The book was accompanied by a volume of Plates illustrative of the Researches and Operations of Belzoni in Egypt and Nubia, realized by the Italian engraver Agostino Aglio based on drawings by Belzoni and his wife. Carter describes Belzoni's account of his experiences in Egypt as "one of the most fascinating books in the whole of Egyptian literature". During 1820 and 1821 Belzoni exhibited facsimiles of the tomb of Seti I. The exhibition was held at the Egyptian Hall, Piccadilly, London. In 1822 Belzoni showed his model in Paris. Belzoni's discoveries made him famous in Europe. He frequented such illustrious personalities as Walter Scott and Prince Augustus Frederick, Duke of Sussex, to whom he dedicated a dissertation on the hieroglyphs on the tomb of Sety I (1821). In April 1822, he departed for Russia, where he was welcomed with great honour in Saint Petersburg by Emperor Alexander I, who presented him with a ring adorned with a topaz.

=== Expedition to West Africa and death ===
In 1823 Belzoni accepted an offer from the African Association of London to lead an expedition to explore West Africa, specifically aiming to find the source of the Niger River and visit the legendary city of Timbuktu. Niger was virtually unknown to Europeans and had only been reached for the first time a few years earlier by the renowned Scottish explorer, Mungo Park. Park had attempted to reach Timbuktu, but he died on the Niger River before he could visit it. Having been refused permission to pass through Morocco, Belzoni chose the Gulf of Guinea coastal route. He reached the Kingdom of Benin, but was seized with dysentery at a village called Gwato (now Ughoton), and died there. He was buried under the branches of an locust tree on the outskirts of the village. According to the renowned traveller Richard Francis Burton, who visited Benin in 1863-1864, Belzoni was murdered and robbed. A local chieftain informed Burton that the townspeople still possessed many of Belzoni's papers. Burton tried to retrieve them, but without success. In 1829 Belzoni's widow published his drawings of the royal tombs at Thebes.

== Commemoration ==
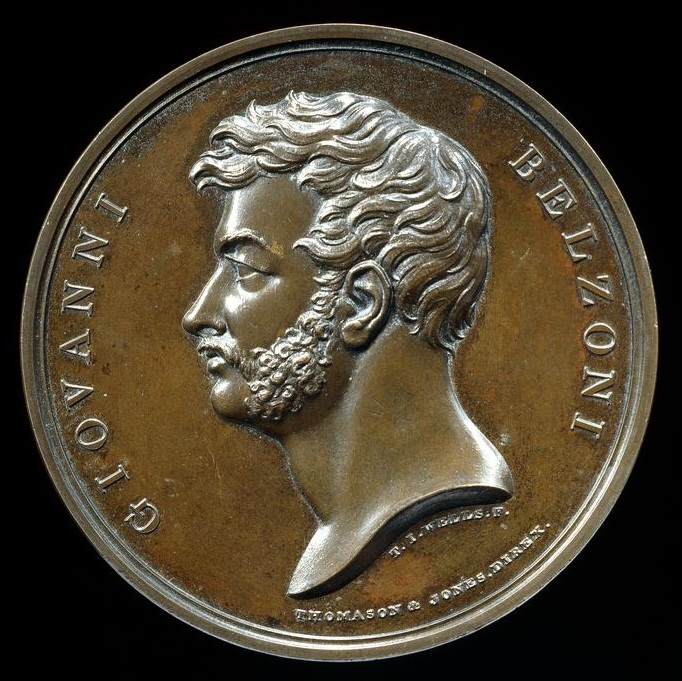
Medal depicting Giovanni Belzoni, British Museum

A medal depicting a profile of Belzoni created by William Brockedon was cast in 1821 by Sir Edward Thomason. Belzoni’s friend Sir Francis Ronalds had introduced the artist and subject. Years later, in 1859 in Padua, Ronalds advised sculptor Rinaldo Rinaldi on the large medallion he was creating to commemorate Belzoni in his hometown.

The 50-minute documentary The Great Belzoni, which explores the life of the Italian archaeologist, was produced by Atlantic Productions in association with the Discovery Channel in 1995. It formed part of a four-part Discovery Channel miniseries called Seekers of the Lost Treasure. Belzoni was portrayed by Matthew Kelly in the 2005 BBC docudrama Egypt.

Belzoni is frequently cited as a major real-life inspiration for George Lucas' creation of Indiana Jones, the daring archaeologist and adventurer played by Harrison Ford in Steven Spielberg's films.

The Horus Mission, initiated in 1988 and directed by Alberto Siliotti for the Italian Ministry of Foreign Affairs, mapped and retraced the journeys of Belzoni in Egypt and Nubia. A scholarly edition of Belzoni's travel writing, edited by Siliotti, was published in London by the British Museum Press in 2001.

Belzoni was the subject of a satirical publication entitled "Belzoni Notes: The Official Organ of the Belzoni Society" published by the Anthropology department of University of Alaska Fairbanks.

The discovery of the Younger Memnon sparked intense interest in London, where it became a key subject of study for the Romantics. Percy Bysshe Shelley's 1818 poem Ozymandias was heavily influenced by it. Horace Smith, a poet in the circle of Shelley, wrote Address to the Mummy in Belzoni's Exhibition.

== Works ==
- Description of the Egyptian Tomb discovered by G. Belzoni. London: Murray. 1821.
- Narrative of the operations and recent discoveries within the pyramids, temples, tombs, and excavations, in Egypt and Nubia, and of a journey to the coast of the Red Sea, in search of the ancient Berenice. 2 vols. London: Murray. 1821.
- Alberto Siliotti, ed. (2001). Belzoni's Travels: Narrative of the Operations and Recent Discoveries in Egypt and Nubia. London: The British Museum Press. ISBN 0-7141-1940-7.

== Gallery ==
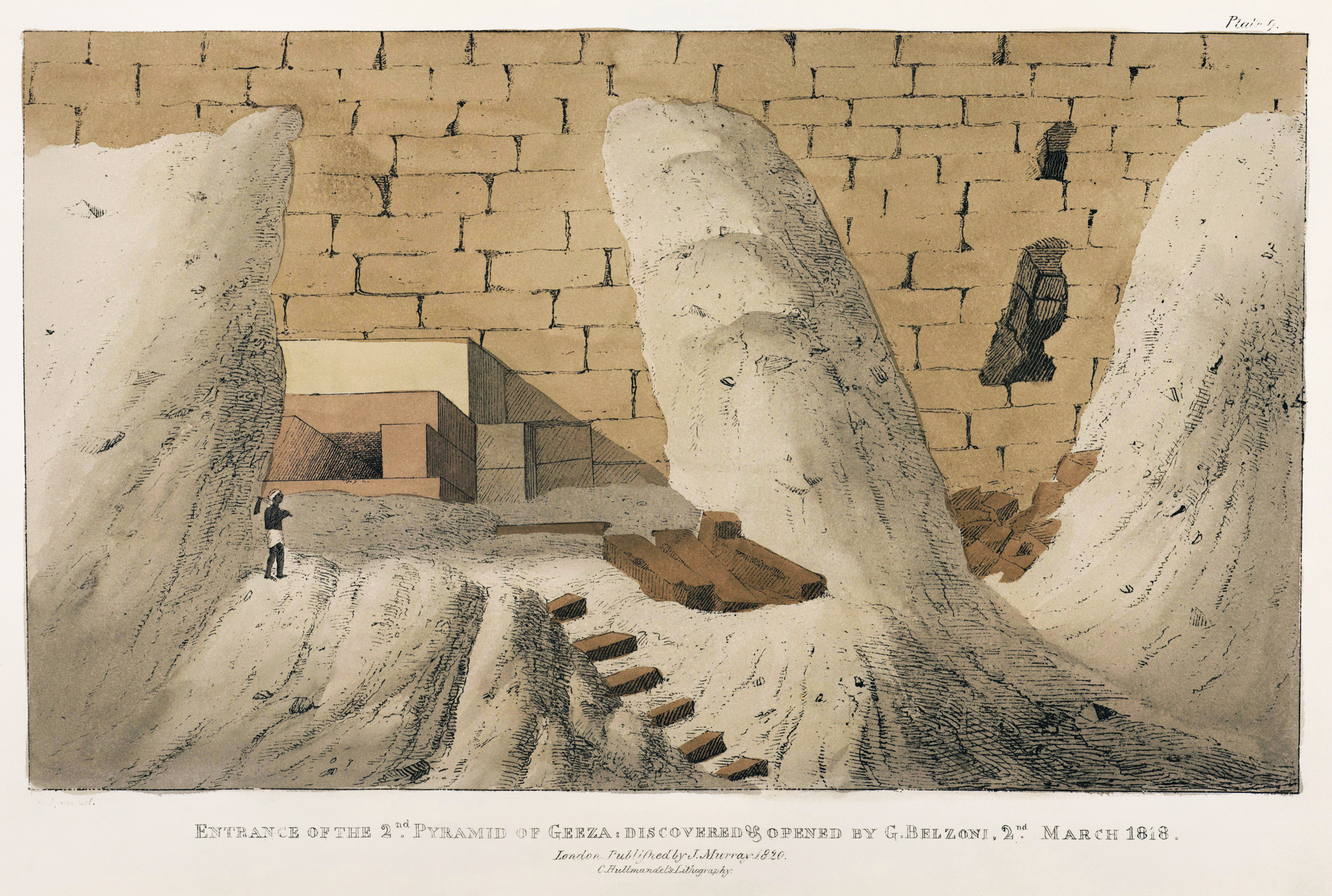
Entrance of the 2nd Pyramid of Geeza, etched by Aglio after a drawing by Belzoni

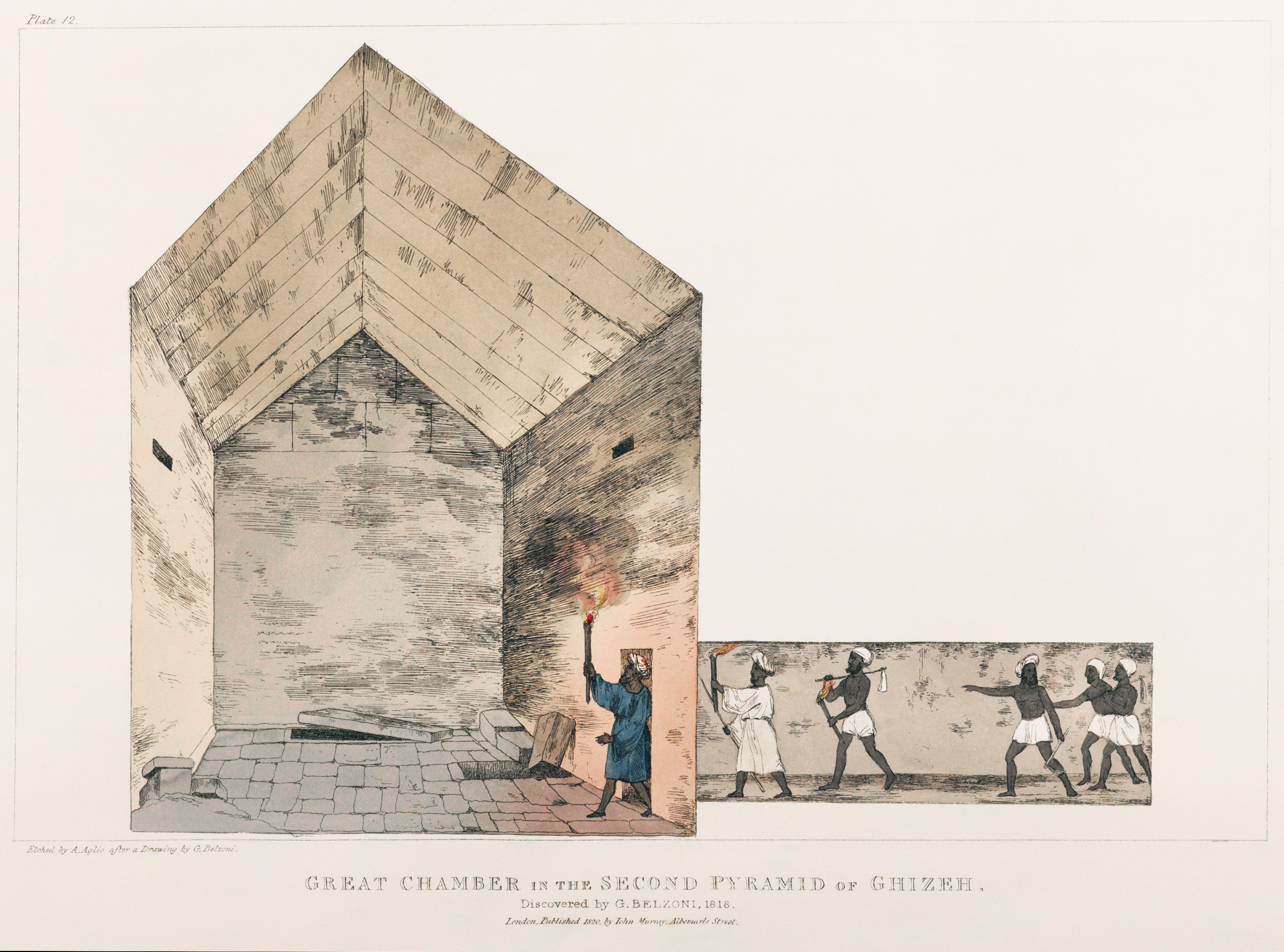
The Great Chamber in the second pyramid of Gizeh, etched by Aglio after a drawing by Belzoni

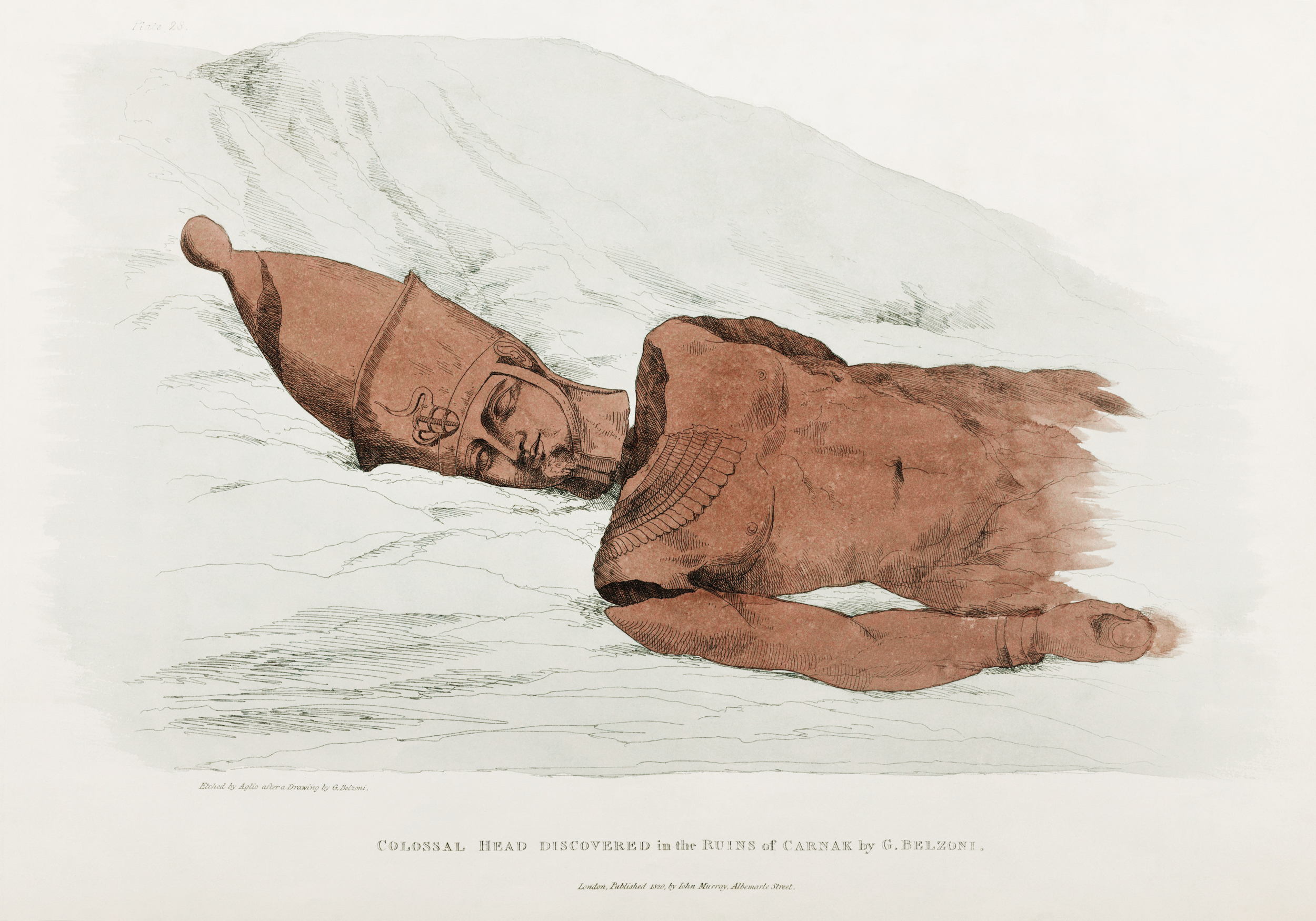
Colossal Head Discovered in the Ruins of Karnak, etched by Aglio after a drawing by Belzoni

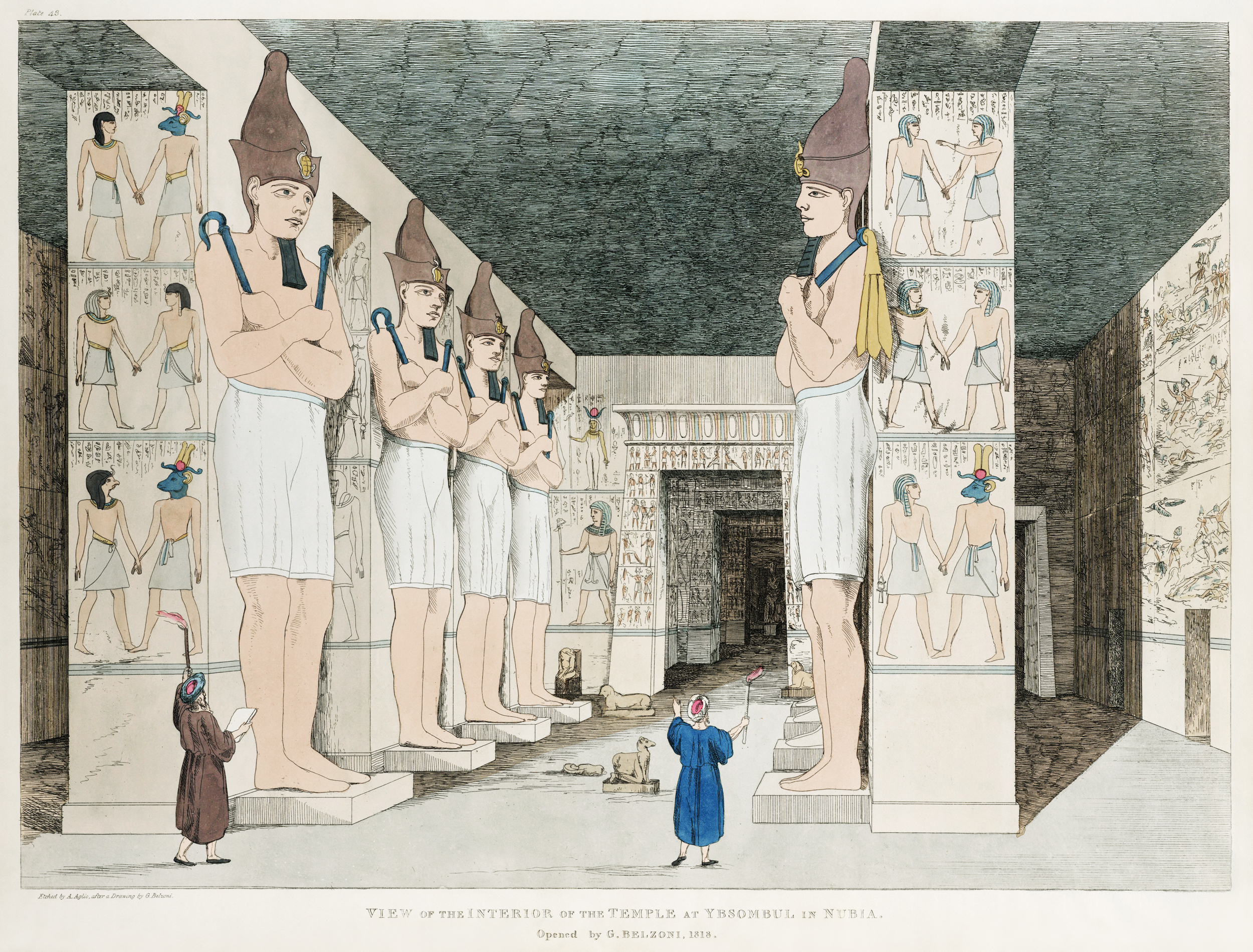
Interior of the Temple at Ybsambul, etched by Aglio after a drawing by Belzoni

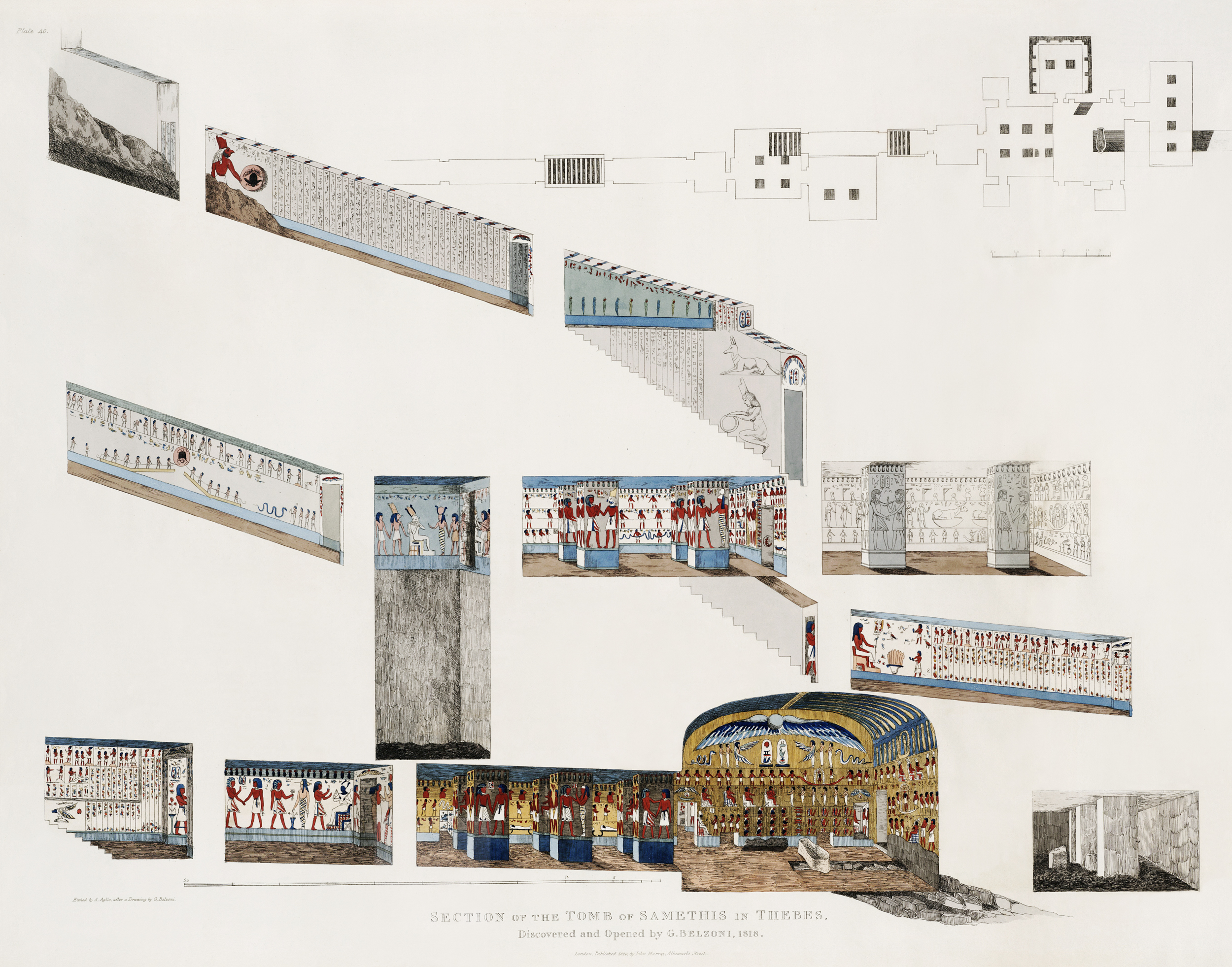
Section of the great Tomb of Psammuthis, etched by Aglio after a drawing by Belzoni

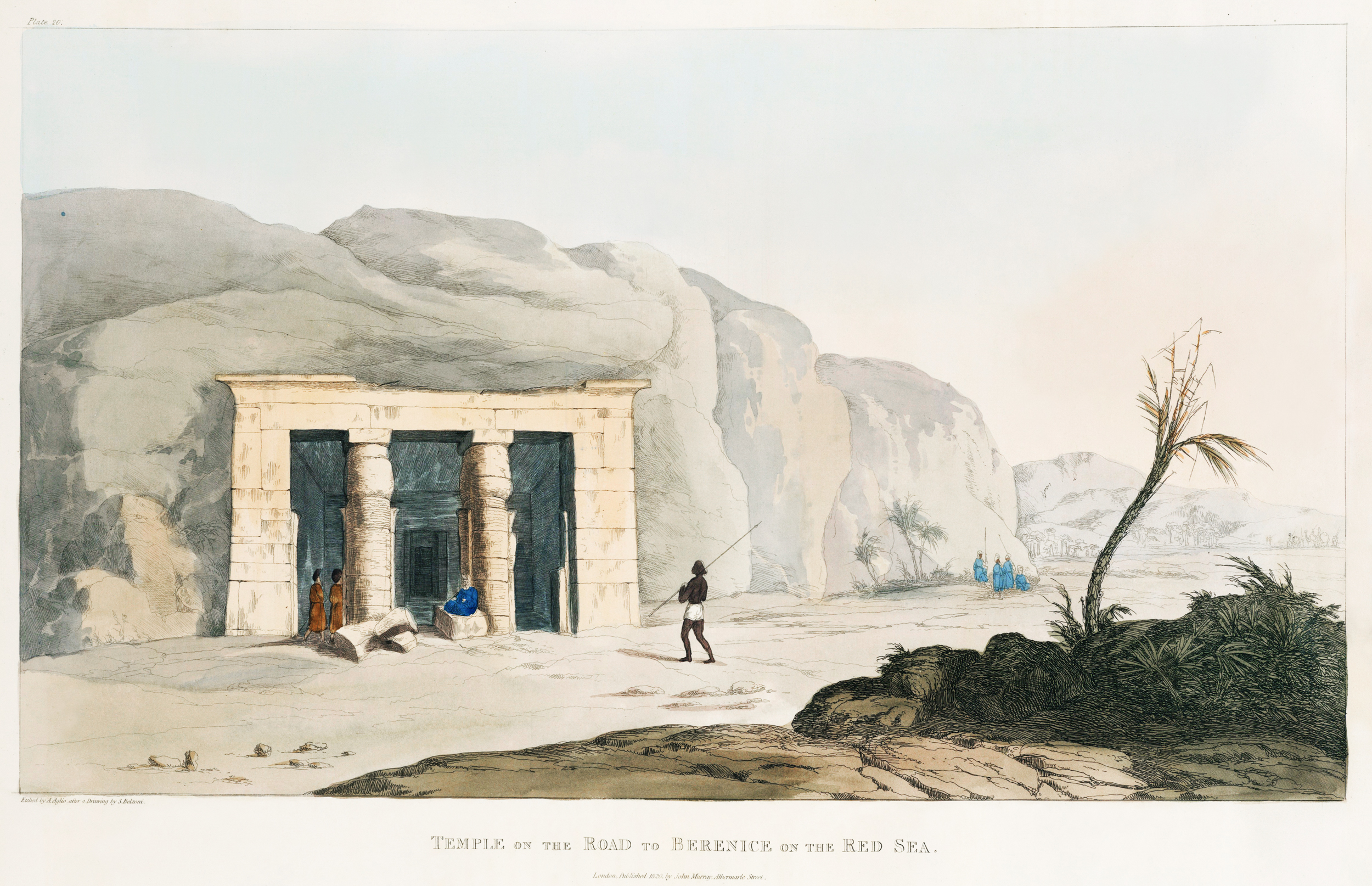
Temple on the road to Berenice, etched by Aglio after a drawing by Belzoni

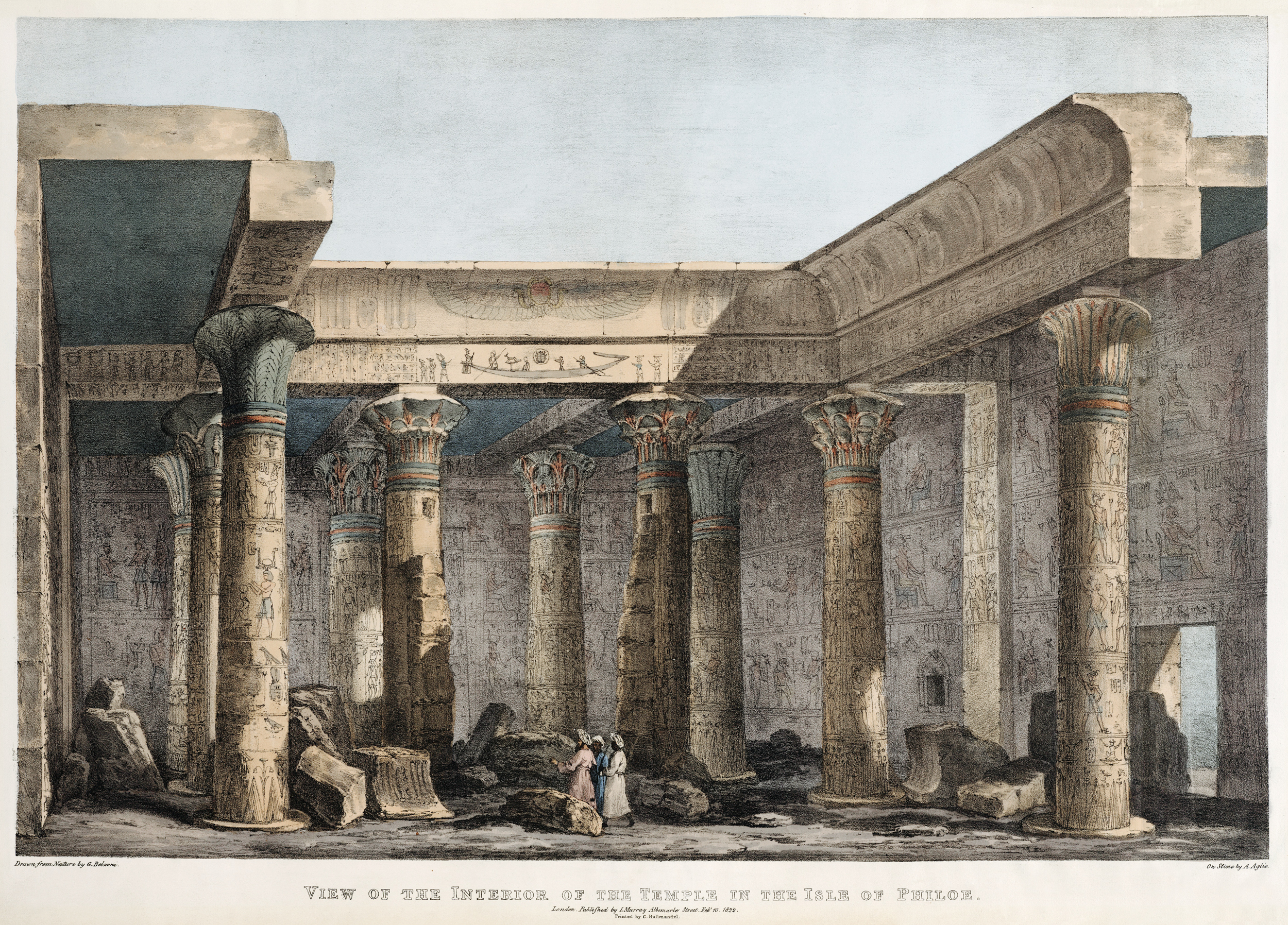
View of the interior of the temple in the Isle of Philoe, etched by Aglio after a drawing by Belzoni

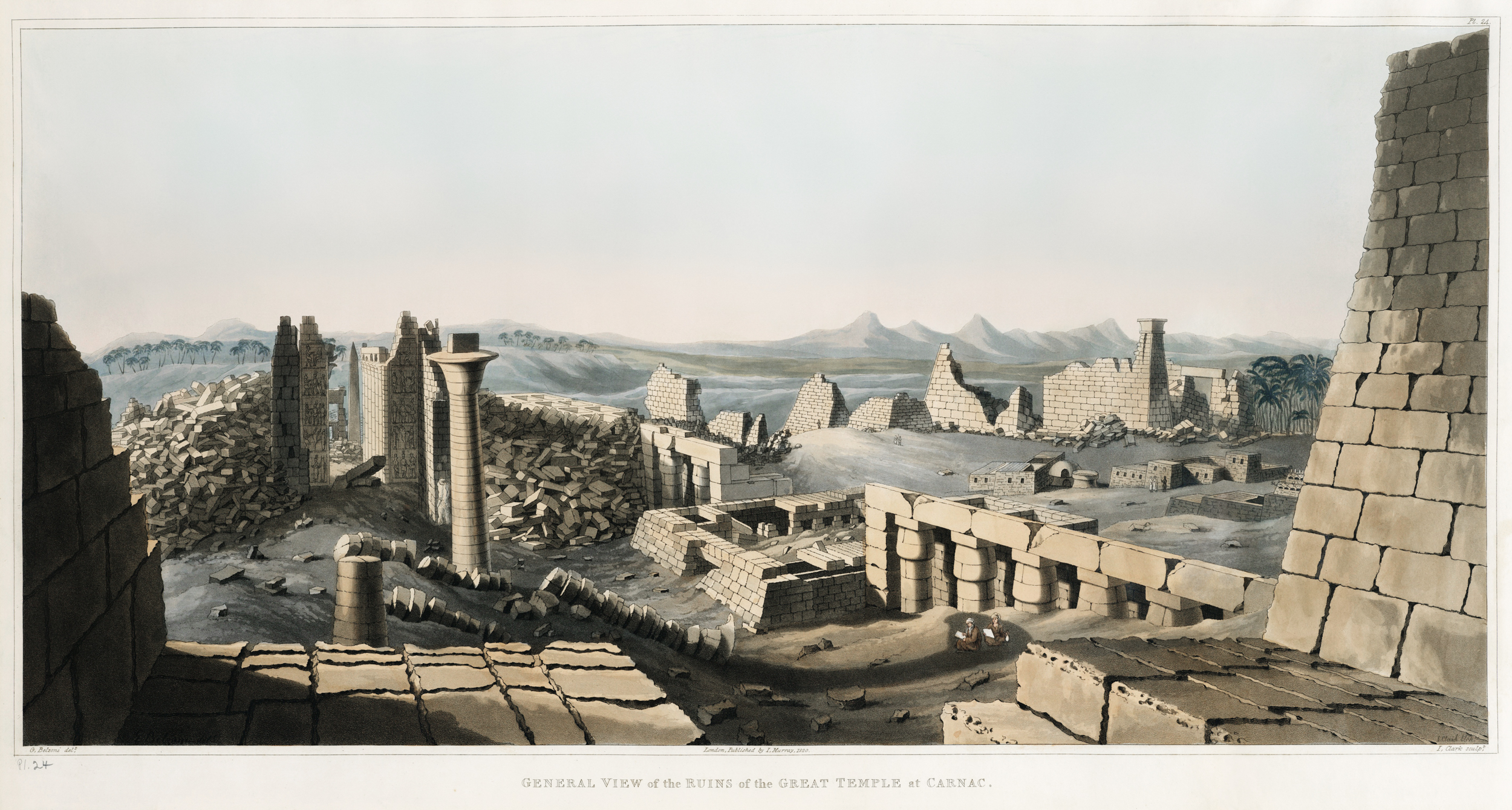
General View of the Ruin of Carnak, etched by Clark after a drawing by Belzoni

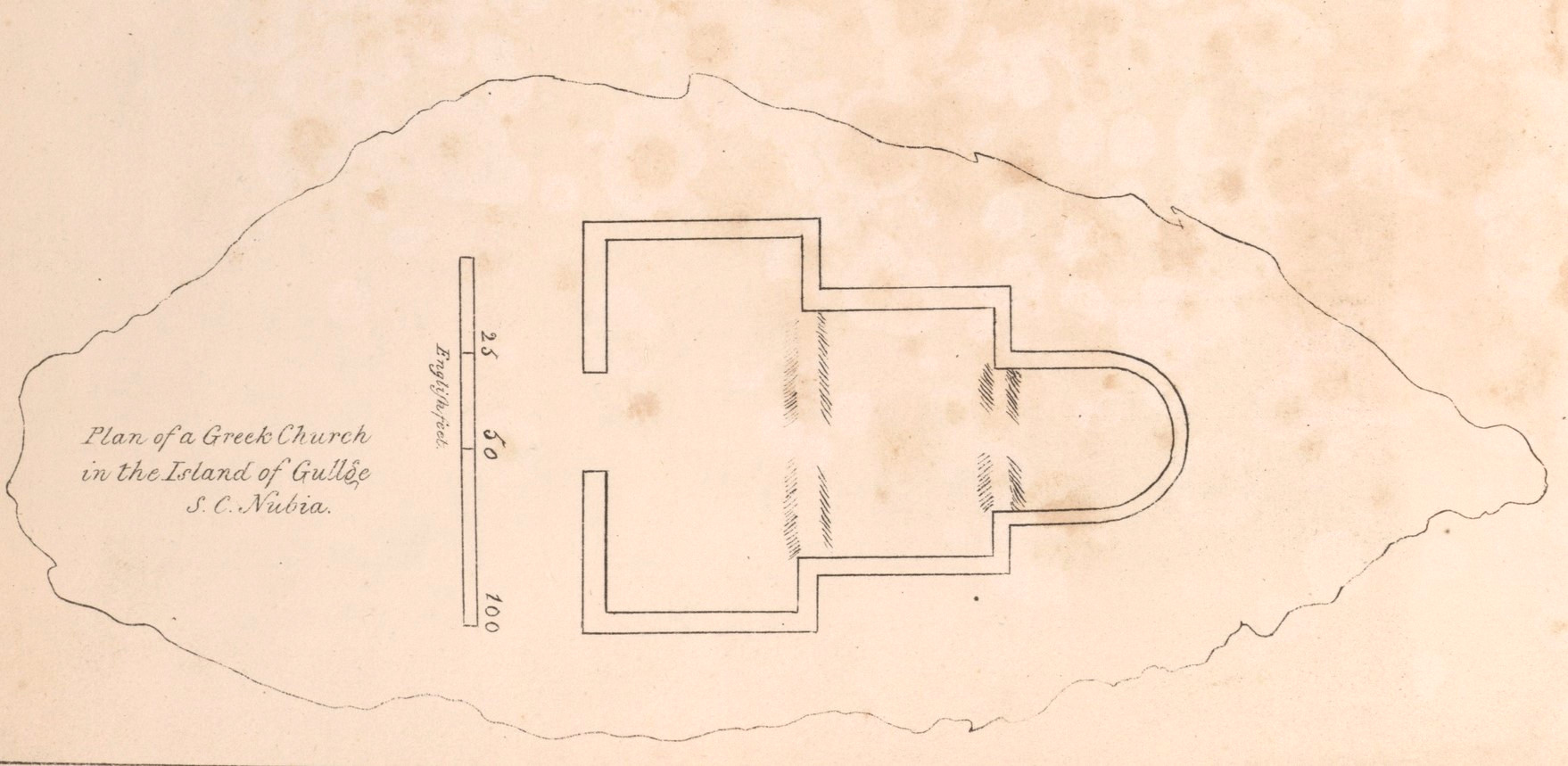
Plan of a ruined Nubian church. From Plates illustrative of the researches and operations of G. Belzoni in Egypt and Nubia (1821)

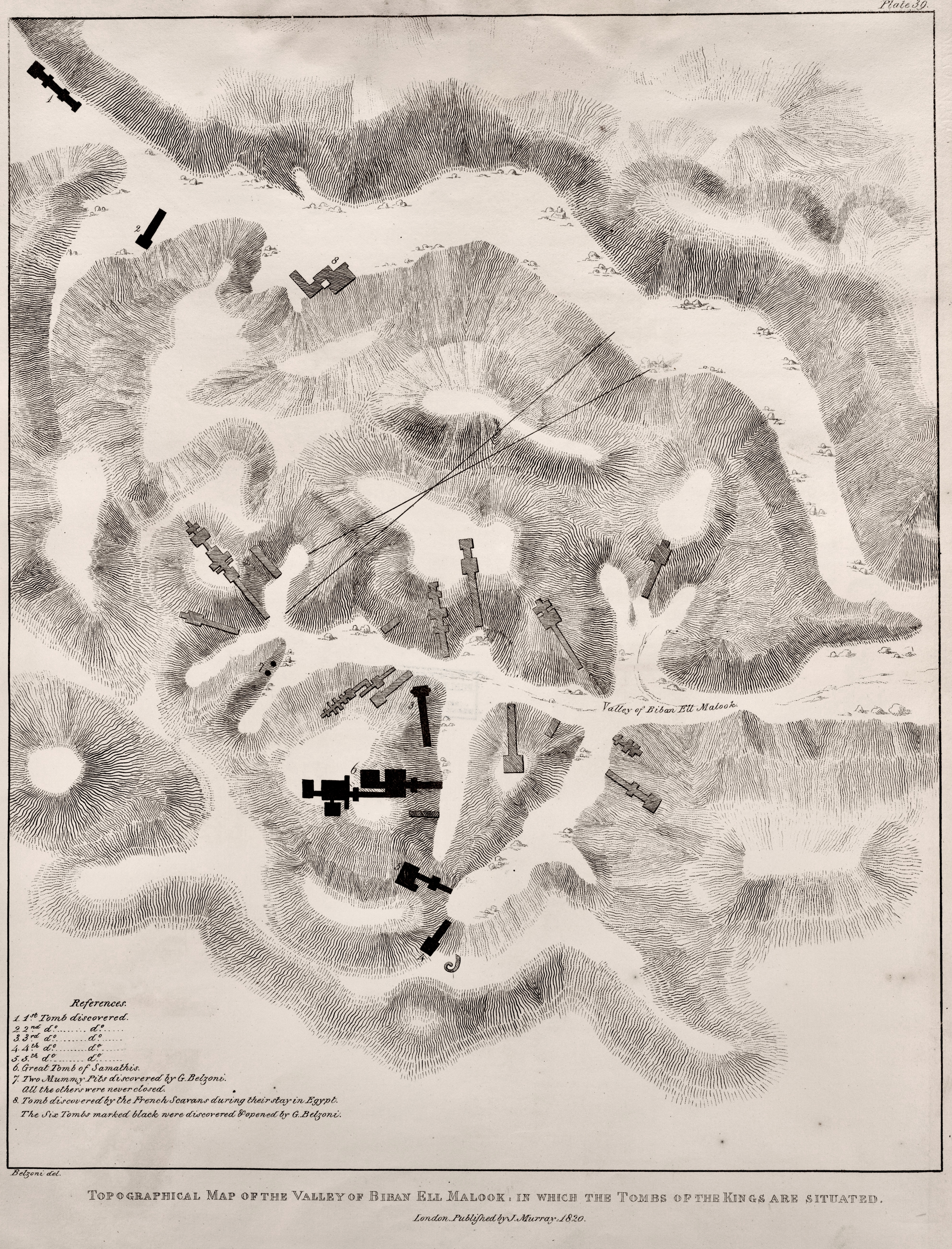
Topographical map of the Valley of the Kings published by Belzoni in his Narrative (1821)

== See also ==
- List of megalithic sites
- Howard Carter
- Flinders Petrie
- Ippolito Rosellini
- Anastasini Circus

== Sources and further reading ==
- Lane-Poole, Stanley (1885). "Belzoni, Giovanni Baptista" . In Stephen, Leslie (ed.). Dictionary of National Biography. Vol. 4. London: Smith, Elder & Co.
- This article incorporates text from a publication now in the public domain: Chisholm, Hugh, ed. (1911). "Belzoni, Giovanni Battista". Encyclopædia Britannica. Vol. 3 (11th ed.). Cambridge University Press. p. 713.
- This article incorporates text from a publication now in the public domain: Ryan, Edwin (1913). "Giambattista Belzoni". In Herbermann, Charles (ed.). Catholic Encyclopedia. New York: Robert Appleton Company.
- Rée, Peta (2004). "Belzoni, Giovanni Battista". Oxford Dictionary of National Biography (online ed.). Oxford University Press. doi:10.1093/ref:odnb/2072. (Subscription, Wikipedia Library access or UK public library membership required.)
- Burton, Richard (July 1880). "Giovanni Battista Belzoni" (PDF). The Cornhill Magazine. XLII: 36–50.
- Mayes, Stanley (2003). The Great Belzoni: The Circus Strongman Who Discovered Egypt's Treasures. London: Tauris Parke Paperbacks. ISBN 978-1-84511-333-9.
- Noël Hume, Ivor (2005). Belzoni: The Giant Archaeologists Love to Hate. Charlottesville: University of Virginia Press. ISBN 978-0-8139-3140-1.
- Jasanoff, Maya (2005). Edge of Empire: Lives, Culture, and Conquest in the East, 1750-1850. New York: Random House. ISBN 1-4000-7546-7.
- Ronalds, B.F. Sir Francis Ronalds: Father of the Electric Telegraph, Imperial College Press (2016), ISBN 978-1-78326-917-4 - describes the creation of Belzoni's likeness
- Dawson, Warren Royal (1972). Who was who in Egyptology (2nd ed.). London: Egypt Exploration Society. ISBN 978-0856980312.
- Disher, Maurice Willson (1957). Pharoah's Fool. London: Heinemann.
- Lesko, Barbara S. (1999). "Belzoni, Giovanni Baptista". In Kathryn A. Bard (ed.). Encyclopedia of the Archaeology of Ancient Egypt. London: Routledge. pp. 168–169. ISBN 0-415-18589-0.
- Zatterin, Marco (2000). Il gigante del Nilo. Storia e avventure del Grande Belzoni. Milan: Mondadori. ISBN 978-8804477990.
- Servadio, Gaia (2018). L'Italiano più famoso del mondo. Milan: Bompiani. ISBN 978-8845297335.
