= Ramesses X =

Ninth ruler of the 20th dynasty of Ancient Egypt

- Also written Ramses and Rameses
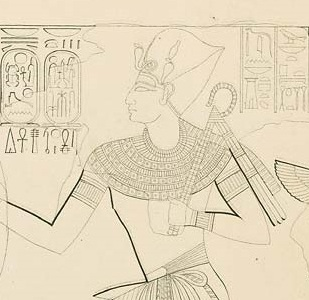
- Detail of Ramesses X on the entrance of KV18 by Karl Richard Lepsius

Pharaoh
- Reign: 3-4 regnal years 1110–1106 BC
- Predecessor: Ramesses IX
- Successor: Ramesses XI
Royal titulary
Horus name
Kanakht Sekhaaenre
K3-nḫt-sḫˁˁ-n-Rˁ
Strong bull, he who appears at the behest of Ra
G5	E2 D40 C2 O34 N28 D36 D36 N35
Prenomen
Khepermaatre Setepenre
Ḫpr-m3ˁ.t-Rˁ-stp-n-Rˁ
Manifestation of the Maat of Ra, the chosen one of Ra
M23 t L2 t < N5 L1 C10 N5 U21 n >
Nomen
Ramesses Amunherkhepeshef Meryamun
Rˁ-msj-sw-Jmn-ḥr-ḫpš=f-mrj-Jmn
Ra fashioned him, strong arm of Amun, beloved of Amun
< C2 F31 C12 O34 O34 N36 M17 Y5 N35 I9 >
Ramesses Amun[herkhepeshef]
Rˁ-msj-sw-Jmn-ḥr-ḫpš=f
Ra fashioned him, strong arm of Amun
< C2 C12 M23 F31 S29 >
Ramesses
Rˁ-msj-sw
Ra fashioned him
< C2 F31 O34 O34 >
- Children: Ramesses XI?
- Died: 1107 BC
- Burial: KV18 (intended, never used)
- Dynasty: 20th Dynasty

Khepermaatre Ramesses X (also written Ramses and Rameses) (ruled 1110-1106 BC) was the ninth pharaoh of the 20th Dynasty of Ancient Egypt. His birth name was Amunherkhepeshef. His prenomen or throne name, Khepermaatre, means "The Justice of Re Abides."

== Reign ==
Journal from year 3 of Ramesses X's reign, from Deir el-Medina, between 1110 and 1107 BC. Museo Egizio, Turin.

=== Year 0 ===
In the regnal year of his predecessor, his accession date fell on 1 prt 27 (first month of the Winter season, day 27).

=== Year 1 ===
No records.

=== Year 2 ===
His year 2 is attested by Papyrus Turin 1932+1939.

=== Year 3 ===
His highest attested regnal year is year 3; the highest attested date in his reign is either "year 3, second month of the Inundation season, day 2" or possibly "year 3, month 4 (no day given)".

=== Year 4 ===
A possible attestation.

=== Reign length ===
Ramesses X is thought to have reigned 3 or 4 regnal years.

However, a later 20th Dynasty papyrus fragment from Deir el-Medina published in 2023 by Egyptologist Robert Demarée refers to a partial date of Year 4, third month of Inundation [or Akhet] together with a change to Year 1, month 4 of Inundation. Although both kings are unnamed, it is strongly suggested by Demarée to refer to the reigns of Ramesses X and his successor Ramesses XI because Ramesses X is "the only king in the second half of the 20th Dynasty" known to have had a Year 3 and, hence, a probable Year 4 attested here. If confirmed, this would mean that Ramesses X ruled for 3 years and 10 months or nearly 4 years before he died. The only other 20th Dynasty king who died in his regnal Year 4 was Ramesses V but this ruler died around the time interval between the first and second month of Peret So, the papyrus document above cannot refer to Ramesses V.

The older theory put forward on astronomical grounds by Richard Parker that Ramesses X may have reigned for 9 years, has since been abandoned. Likewise, the suggested ascription of Theban graffito 1860a to a hypothetical year 8 of Ramesses X is no longer supported.

== Ramesses XI's accession date (or Ramesses X's death date) ==
Robert Demarée observes that the new Year 4 papyrus evidence contradicts the conventional view that Ramesses XI--Ramesses X's successor--had his succession on III Shemu day 20 which has been accepted by most scholars until recently. Demaree notes, however, that....

....the sources to support this suggested date can hardly be called decisive. The two key documents quoted are P. Turin Cat. 1888 + Cat. 2095 and P. Ashmolean Museum 1945.96, the Adoption Papyrus. The first is a journal text from the reign of Ramesses XI containing a series of dates spread over several months, with only one full date: Year 18 IV Smw Day 14 or 24.6 Considering this as certain indication of a recent year change is speculation and beyond proof. The [Page 66] second document is the famous Adoption Papyrus, P. Ashmolean Museum 1945.96. In the words of its first editor, Alan Gardiner, the opening lines of this document record, on III Smw Day 20, a visit by Ramesses XI to the Temple of Karnak to announce his accession to the god Amun, followed by an offering to this deity.7 The text clearly only speaks of informing the god Amun of the accession of the king – sr.t xa n nTr pn Sps n Imn. Contrary to the opinion of the scholars who first posited III Shemu Day 20 as the coronation date, the accession of the king did not take place on that day at Karnak. This ceremony certainly had already taken place earlier either in the Delta residence or at Memphis, and as usual the king later had to pay visits to other state gods to inform them of his accession.

== Family ==
The English Egyptologists Aidan Dodson and Dyan Hilton wrote in a 2004 book:

No evidence is known to indicate the relationship between the final kings Ramesses IX, X and XI. If they were a father-son succession, Tyti, who bears the titles of King's Daughter, King's Wife and King's Mother, would seem [to be] a good candidate for the wife of Ramesses X, but little else can be discerned.

However, Dodson's hypothesis here on Tyti's position must now be discarded since it was proven in 2010 that Tyti was rather a queen of a previous 20th dynasty pharaoh instead. She is mentioned in the partly fragmented Harris papyrus to be Ramesses III's wife as Dodson himself acknowledges.

== Attestations ==
Ramesses X is a poorly documented king. His year 2 is attested by Papyrus Turin 1932+1939, while his third year is documented in the Necropolis Journal of the Workmen of Deir El Medina. This diary mentions the general idleness of the necropolis workmen, at least partly due to the threat posed by Libyan marauders in the Valley of the Kings. It records that the Deir El-Medina workmen were absent from work in Year 3 IIIrd Month of Peret (i.e., Winter) days 6, 9, 11, 12, 18, 21 and 24 for fear of the "desert-dwellers" (i.e., the Libyans or Meshwesh) who evidently roamed through Upper Egypt and Thebes at will. This is partly a reflection of the massive Libyan influx into the Western Delta region of Lower Egypt during this time. Ramesses X is also the last New Kingdom king whose rule over Nubia is attested from an inscription at Aniba.

== Death and burial ==
At Thebes, the tomb of Ramesses X (KV18) was located in the Valley of the Kings and left unfinished. It is uncertain if he was ever buried there, since no remains or fragments of funerary objects were discovered within it. His body has not been found. It is possible that he was buried elsewhere in Thebes, in Memphis, or perhaps at Pi-Ramesses in the Delta; the evidence for the latter is disputed.
