= Artist's Sketch of Pharaoh Spearing a Lion =

Ostracon drawing from the 20th Dynasty of Egypt (c. 1186–1070 BCE)

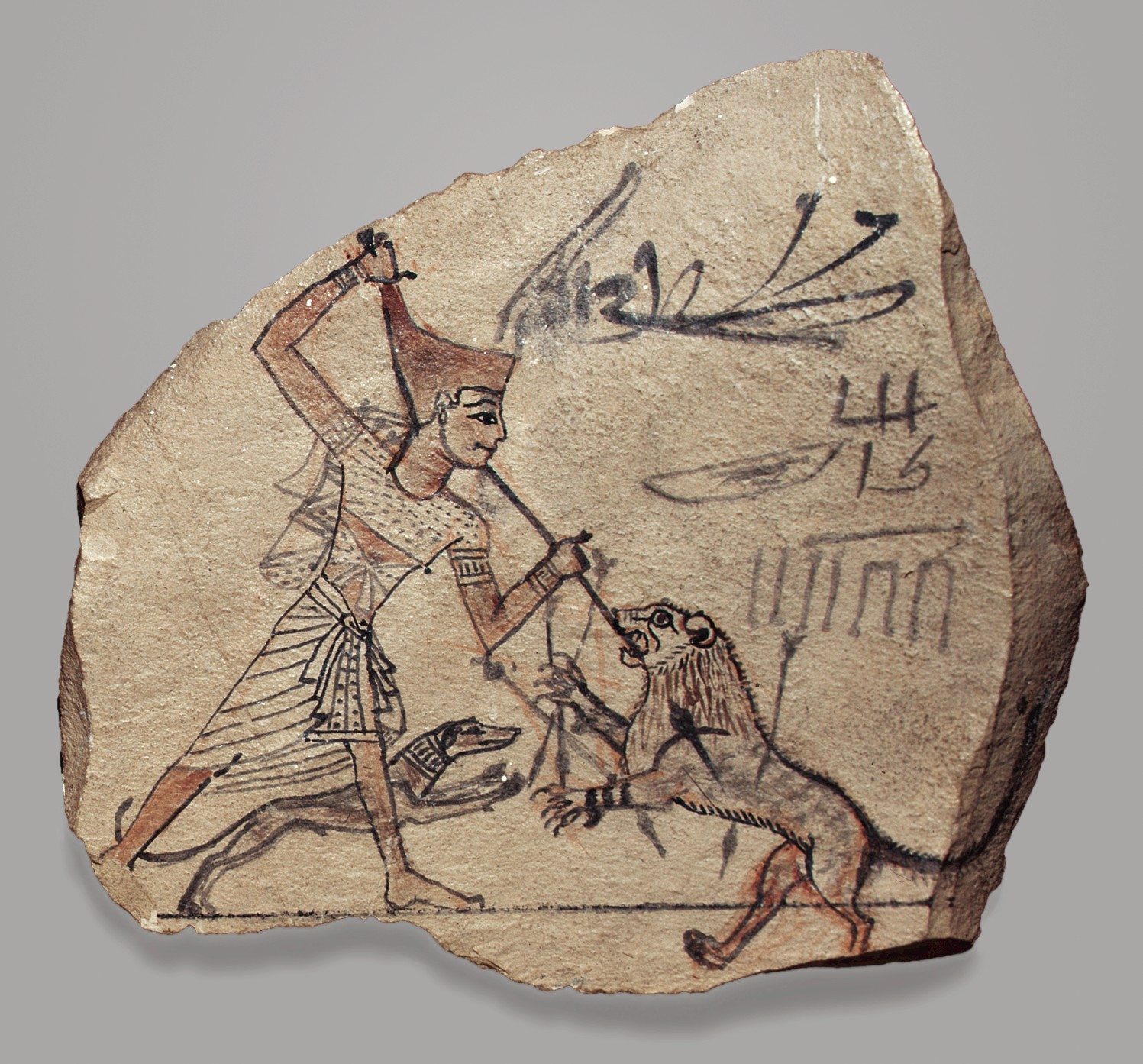
- Year: Twentieth Dynasty of Egypt
- Location: Metropolitan Museum of Art
- Accession No.: 26.7.1453
- Identifiers: The Met object ID: 544076

Artist's Sketch of Pharaoh Spearing a Lion is an ostracon drawing from the Twentieth Dynasty of Egypt (ca. 1186–1070 B.C., part of the Ramesside period). It is in the collection of the Metropolitan Museum of Art.

== Early history and creation ==
This is a piece of limestone sketched with ink. It was a trial sketch, though the final has not been found in any tombs nor does the figure conform to new kingdom proportions, that was discarded in the Valley of the Kings. It was discovered at the Tomb of Tutankhamun, near the entrance, during excavations in 1920.

== Description and interpretation ==
The work depicts a Ramesside pharaoh spearing a lion. The lion symbolizes the enemies of Egypt. The back of the work has a section of hieratic text, which reads: "The slaughter of every foreign land, the Pharaoh—may he live, prosper, and be healthy." Hieratic text is a term for cursive writing, which had been around and evolving since as early as the 2nd dynasty.

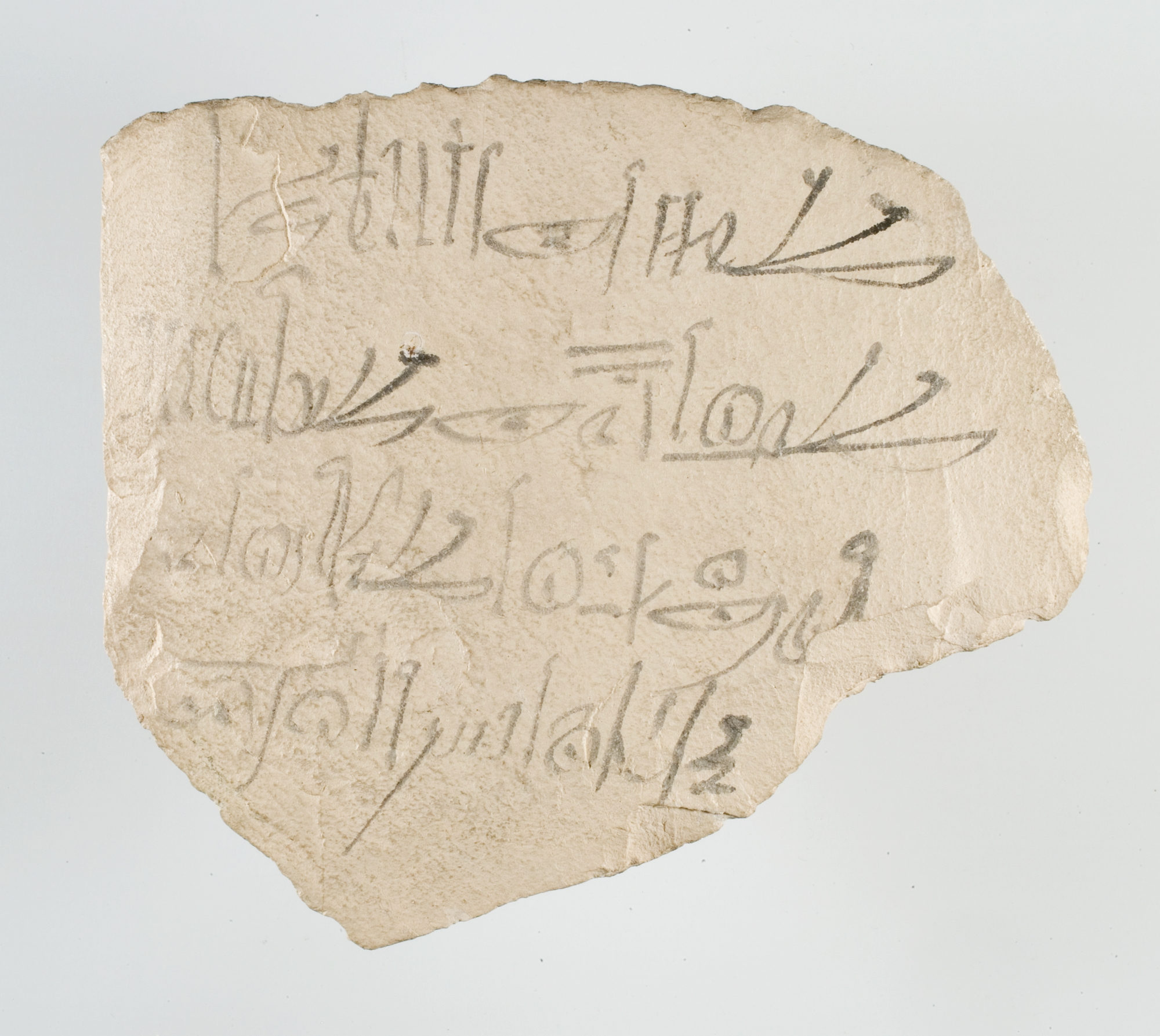
Back of the ostracon, featuring hieratic text

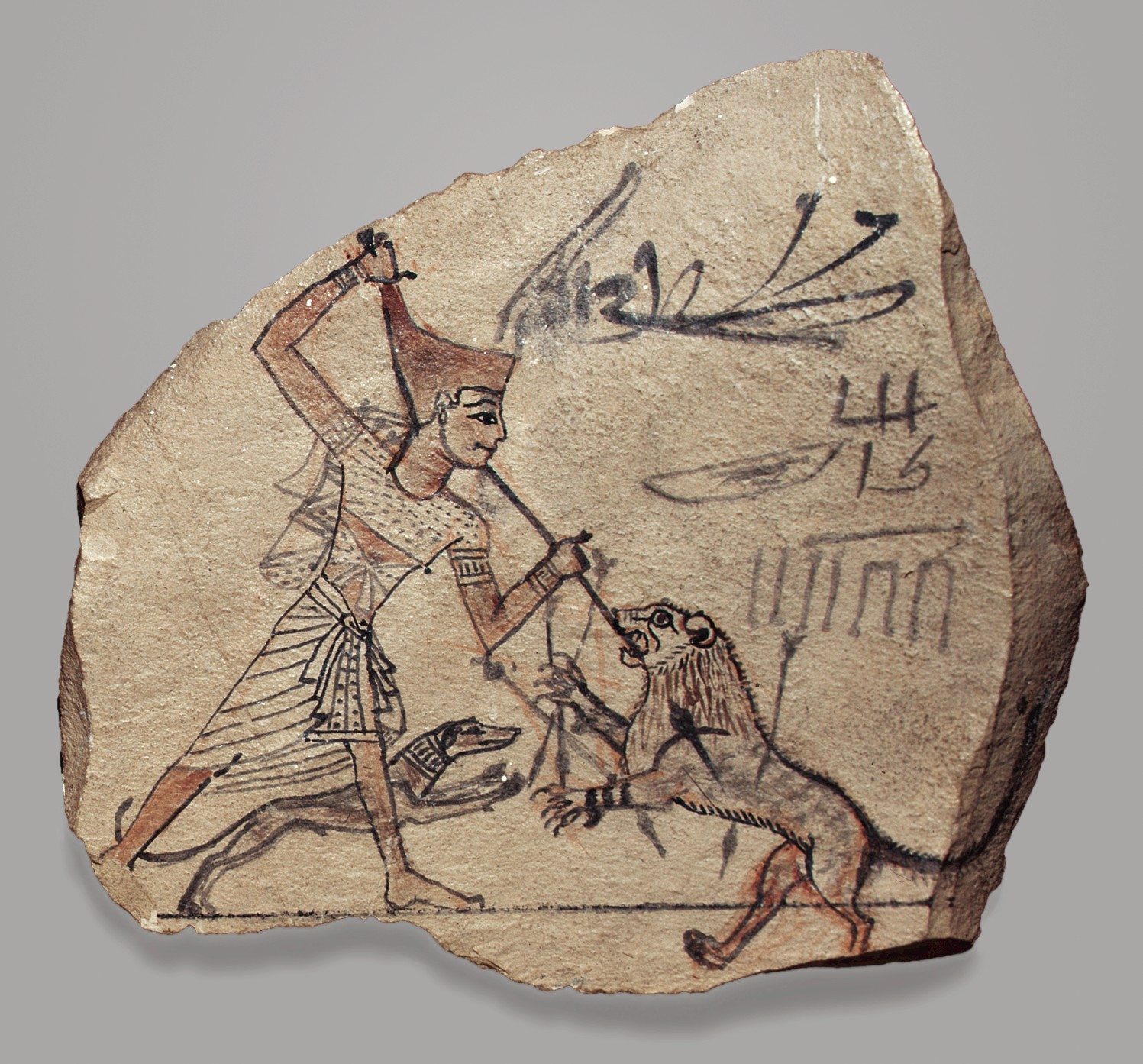
Front of the ostracon, featuring figural image
