= Henutwati =

- Queen consort of Egypt
- Burial: unknown
- Spouse: Pharaoh Ramesses V
Names
- Ta-Henutwati
- Dynasty: 20th Dynasty of Egypt

H W24 t Z5 wa a U33 i
Henutwati
in hieroglyphs
Era: New Kingdom
(1550–1069 BC)

Henutwati or Ta-Henutwati was an ancient Egyptian queen of the Twentieth Dynasty; the Great Royal Wife of Ramesses V.

Henutwati's estate is mentioned in the Wilbour Papyrus, a document dated to the reign of Ramesses V. Based on this document, Henutwati is thought to be a wife of this King, but it is possible she dates to an earlier period.

Wolfram Grajetzki gives the hieroglyphs as transcribed from hieratic as follows:

M23 t n G7 N41 t N33 G7 Z5 Z5 Z5 s G36 r t&A H W24 t Z5 wa a U33 i
