= Tawerettenru =

- Queen consort of Egypt
- Burial: unknown
- Spouse: Pharaoh Ramesses V
Names
- Tawerettenru
- Dynasty: 20th Dynasty of Egypt

t&A G36 r t Y1 U33 n Z2 r V1 G7
Tawerettenru
in hieroglyphs
Era: New Kingdom
(1550–1069 BC)

Tawerettenru was an ancient Egyptian queen of the Twentieth Dynasty; the Royal Wife of Ramesses V.

Tawerettenru's estate is mentioned in the Wilbour Papyrus, a document dated to the reign of Ramesses V. Based on this document, Tawerettenru is thought to be a wife of this King, but it is possible she dates to an earlier period.

Grajetzki gives the hieroglyphs as transcribed from hieratic as follows:

M23 t n G7 N41 t N33 G7 Z5 Z5 Z5 Z5 Z5 Z5 Z5 Z5 t&A G36 r t Y1 U33 n Z2 r V1 G7
