= Duatentopet =

- Queen consort of Egypt
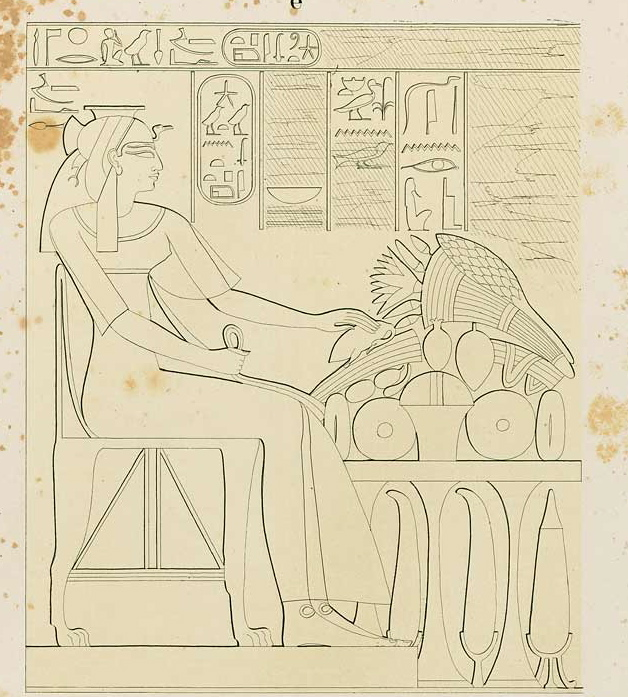
- Duatentopet from QV74
- Burial: QV74
- Spouse: Pharaoh Ramesses IV
- Issue: Ramesses V
Names
- Duatentopet of Egypt
- Dynasty: 20th Dynasty of Egypt
- Religion: Ancient Egyptian religion

< N14 Z7 Z7 U33 S3 t i O45 p t >
Duatentopet
in hieroglyphs
Era: New Kingdom
(1550–1069 BC)

Duatentopet or Tentopet (fl. 1150 BCE) was an ancient Egyptian queen of the 20th Dynasty, the wife of Pharaoh Ramesses IV, and mother of Ramesses V. Even though the identity of Ramesses IV's wife has not been clearly stated in history, she is considered the most likely candidate by virtue of the titles she was given and which were found listed in her tomb (QV74).

In the Karnak Temple Complex, an Adoratrix named Tentopet is shown with Ramesses III in the Temple of Khonsu. It is thought likely that Tentopet and Queen Duatentopet were the same person, and that she was a daughter of Ramesses III. This would make her a sister, or a half-sister, of her husband.

However, Tentopet is not actually depicted together with Ramesses III in the Temple of Khonsu. More precisely, she appears as a Divine Adoratrix on the south jamb of the doorway leading to Hall XI of the Khonsu Temple at Karnak, where she is shown playing sistrum before the god Khonsu. The scene is located in a section of the temple constructed by Ramesses IV, in which Ramesses III and Ramesses IV are the only pharaohs represented. For this reason, several scholars have considered it reasonable to identify Tentopet as the queen of Ramesses IV. Nevertheless, her title of Divine Adoratrix does not in itself indicate any familial relationship to either king.

Furthermore, Queen Duatentopet has never been conclusively attested with the title "King's Daughter." Although this title appears in an annex of her tomb (QV74), the tomb was originally prepared for a daughter of Ramesses II. Elsewhere in QV74, titles identifying the original owner as a royal daughter were systematically altered and replaced with titles more appropriate to a queen, in order to adapt the monument for Duatentopet's burial. This reworking of the tomb may therefore suggest that Duatentopet was not herself a king's daughter. Instead, she appears more likely to have been a Divine Adoratrix, a status that she may already have held before her marriage. She has also been proposed as the earliest securely attested queen of the New Kingdom to bear this title.

Her steward Amenhotep was buried in Theban tomb TT346.
