= Ramesses V =

Pharaoh in the ancient Egypt

- Also written Ramses and Rameses
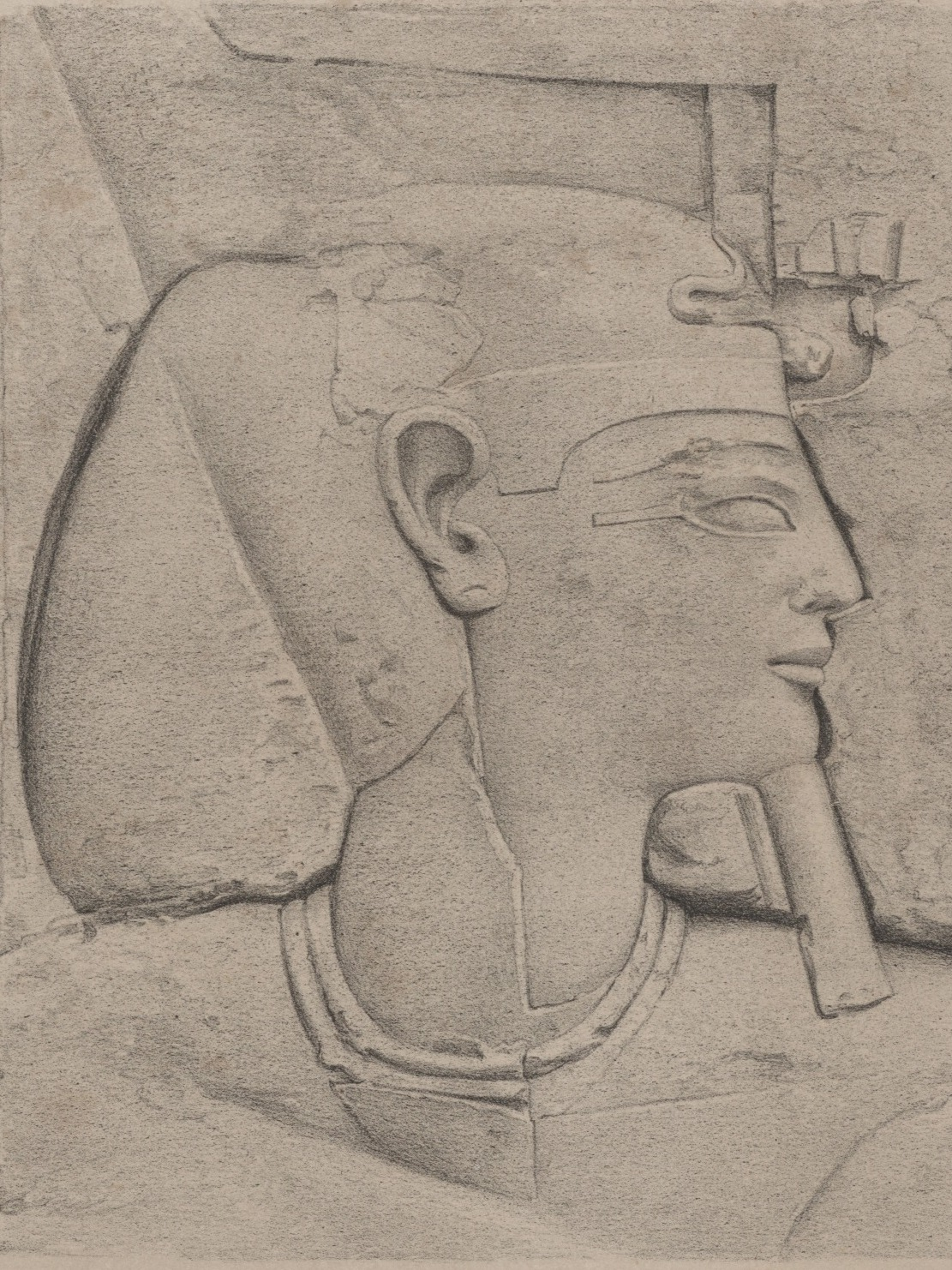
- Drawing of a relief of pharaoh Ramesses V.

Pharaoh
- Reign: 4 regnal years 1148–1144 BC
- Predecessor: Ramesses IV
- Successor: Ramesses VI
Royal titulary
Horus name
Kanekhetmenmaat
K3-nḫt-mn-m3ˁt
Strong bull, whose Maat is permanent
| G5 | E2 D40 C10 O25 |
Golden Horus
User-renput-mer-Atum
Wsr-rnpwt-mr-Jtm
Rich in years like Atum
| G8 | wsr s M4 M4 M4 W19 i t U15 Aa13 A40 |
Prenomen
Usermaatre Sekheperenre
Wsr-m3ˁt-Rˁ-s-ḫpr-n-Rˁ
Ra is rich in Maat, he who Ra has raised

| M23 X1 L2 X1 | N5 wsr C10 s L1 N5 n |
Nomen
Ramesisu Imen(her)khepeschef
Rˁ msj sw Jmn (ḥr) ḫpš.f
Ra is the one who created him; Amun is his force

| G39 N5 | N5 C2 C12 N36 f s F31 M23 |
- Consorts: Henutwati and Tawerettenru
- Father: Ramesses IV
- Mother: Duatentopet
- Born: c. 12th century BC
- Died: 1144 BC
- Burial: KV9; Mummy found in the KV35 royal cache (Theban Necropolis)
- Dynasty: 20th Dynasty

Usermaatre Sekheperenre Ramesses V (also written Ramses and Rameses) was the fourth pharaoh of the Twentieth Dynasty of Egypt and was the son of Ramesses IV and Duatentopet. His mummy is now on display at the National Museum of Egyptian Civilization in Cairo.

== Reign ==
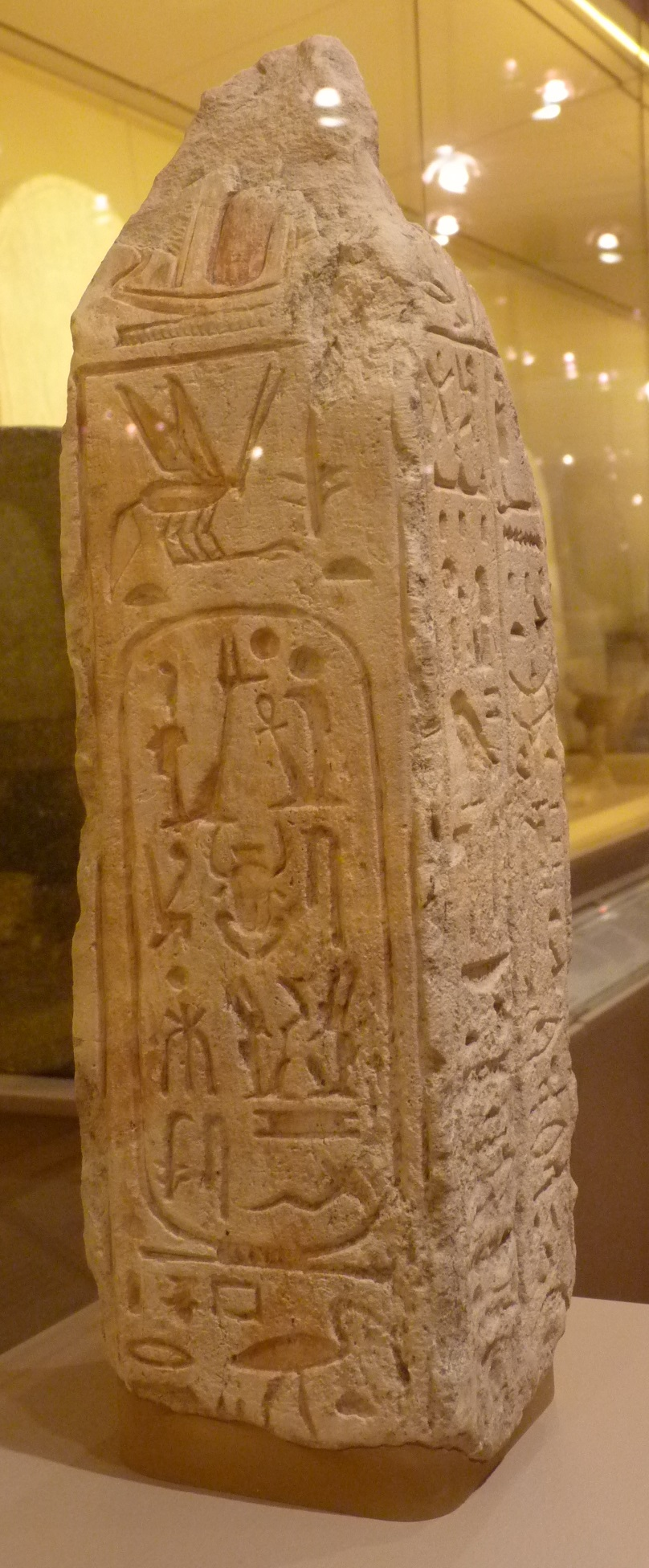
Obelisk of Ramesses V. Archaeological Museum of Bologna, KS 1884

Ramesses V's reign was characterized by the continued growth of the power of the priesthood of Amun, which controlled much of the temple land in the country and the state finances, at the expense of the ruling pharaohs. The Turin 1887 papyrus records a financial scandal during Ramesses' reign that involved the priests of Elephantine.

=== Year 1 ===
A period of domestic instability also afflicted his reign, as evidenced by the fact that, according to the Turin Papyrus Cat. 2044, the workmen of Deir el-Medina periodically stopped work on Ramesses V's KV9 tomb in this king's first regnal year, out of fear of "the enemy", presumably Libyan raiding parties, who had reached the town of Per-Nebyt and "burnt its people." Another incursion by these raiders into Thebes is recorded a few days later. This shows that the Egyptian state was having difficulties ensuring the security of its own elite tomb workers, let alone the general populace, during this troubled time.

=== Year 4 ===
The Wilbour Papyrus, believed to date to Year 4 of Ramesses V's reign, was a major land survey and tax assessment document which covered various lands "extending from near Crocodilopolis (Medinet el-Fayyum) southwards to a little short of the modern town of El-Minya, a distance of some 90 miles." It reveals most of Egypt's land was controlled by the Amun temples, which also directed the country's finances. The document highlights the increasing power of the High Priest of Amun Ramessesnakht whose son, a certain Usimare'nakhte, held the office of chief tax master.

== Death ==
The circumstances of Ramesses V's death are unknown but it is known he had a reign of almost four full years. He died in his 4th Regnal Year around the time interval between the first and second month of Peret.

=== Burial ===
An ostracon records that this king was only buried in Year 2 of Ramesses VI, his successor, which was highly irregular since Egyptian tradition required a king to be mummified and buried precisely 70 days into the reign of his successor.

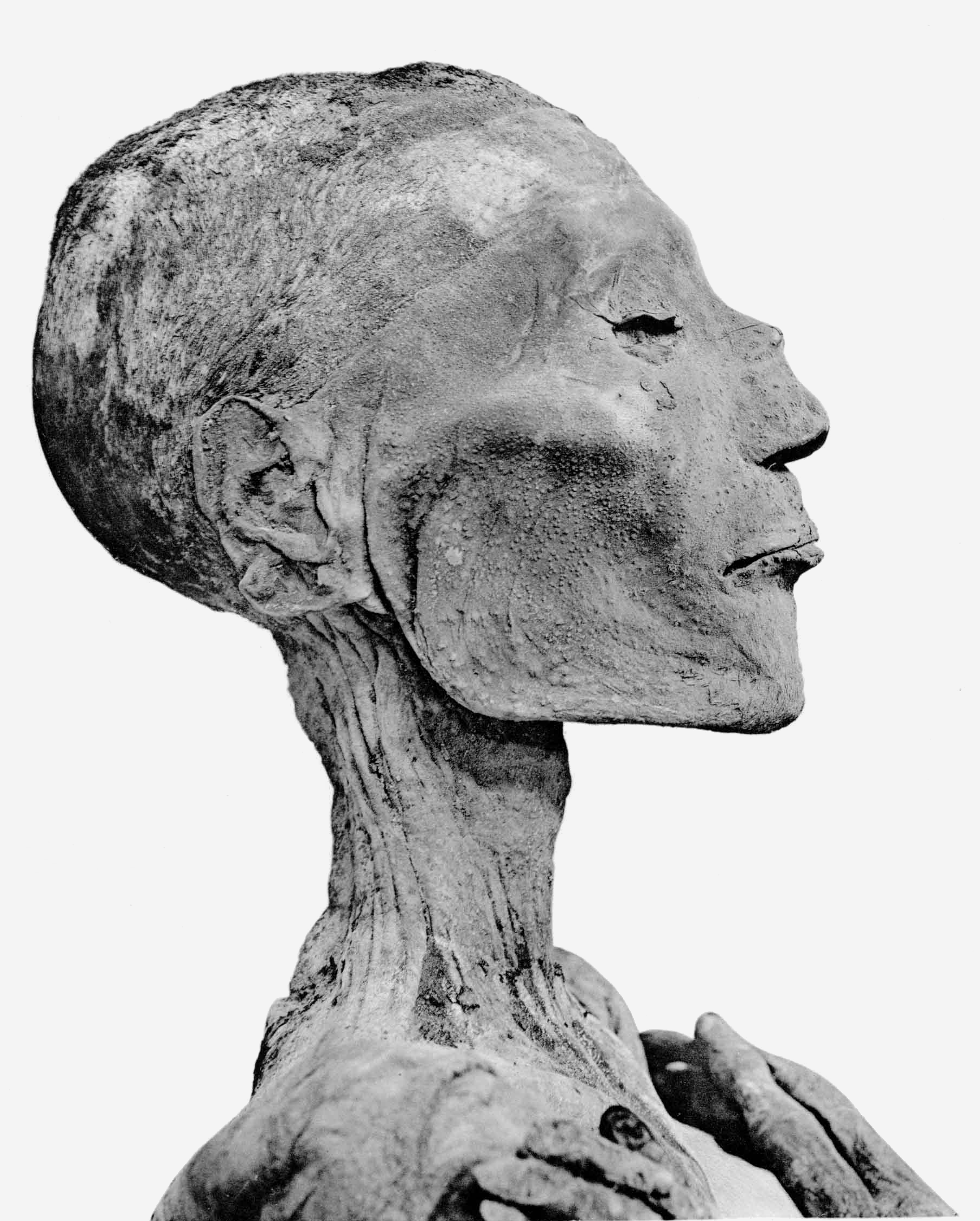
Ramesses V's mummified head.

However, another reason for the much delayed burial of Ramesses V in Year 2, second month of Akhet day 1 of Ramesses VI's reign (see KRI, VI, 343) may have been connected with Ramesses VI's need "to clear out any Libyans [invaders] from Thebes and to provide a temporary tomb for Ramesses V until plans for a double burial within tomb KV9 could be put into effect." Moreover, a Theban work journal (P. Turin 1923) dated to Year 2 of Ramesses VI's reign shows that a period of normality had returned to the Theban West Bank by this time.

=== Mummy ===
The mummy of Ramesses V was recovered in 1898 by Victor Loret in KV35. It was unwrapped and examined by G.E. Smith in 1905, and showed a body full of disease. Smith described him as a young man, Ikram and Dodson suggest he died in his early thirties.

==== Smallpox ====
One theory is that he may have suffered and subsequently died from smallpox (VARV), due to lesions found on his face. If true, he is thought to be one of the earliest known victims of the disease.

While a 2016 discovery has found that the shared ancestral form of modern smallpox dates back to 1580 AD, this study merely indicates that the strains of smallpox circulating at the time of smallpox eradication had a common ancestor in the late 16th century, specifically that "the VARV lineages eradicated during the 20th century had only been in existence for ~200 years, at a time of rapidly expanding human movement and population size in the face of increasingly widespread inoculation and vaccination." Indeed, they say merely about ancient cases of smallpox that "if they were indeed due to smallpox, these early cases were caused by virus lineages that were no longer circulating at the point of eradication in the 1970s." The advent of vaccination, or variolation in China and Japan during the middle ages, could have altered the relative presence of smallpox strains and diminished the presence of ancient strains.

A 2015 review summarizing recent research into the question of smallpox evolution and divergence from its common ancestors suggests it is most likely that smallpox evolved 3000–4000 years ago in East Africa or India, which is not inherently contradicted by the study described the latter of which contains descriptions of smallpox from before the first century AD at least. Finally, another genomic analysis places the evolution of smallpox at 16,000 years before present, and mentions Ramses V: "if the pustular eruption of Ramses V was from smallpox, it could represent a smallpox outbreak from imported cases... rather than regional endemic disease. This hypothesis is supported by the fact that only three mummies in that period had similar lesions."

==== Bubonic Plague ====
Another theory is bubons in his groin, usually associated with the bubonic plague.
