= Temple of Khonsu =

Ancient Egyptian temple

Coordinates: 25°43′00″N 32°39′21″E

- Location within Egypt
- Type: Temple
- Periods: Twentieth Dynasty of Egypt
- Location: Luxor, Egypt
- Part of: Karnak

History
- Built by: Ramesses III

Site notes
- Material: Sandstone, granite

The Temple of Khonsu is an ancient Egyptian temple dedicated to the moon god Khonsu (son of Amun and Mut), located within the southwest sector of the Precinct of Amun-Re at Karnak, which is located at Thebes (modern Luxor) on the east bank of the Nile in Upper Egypt. As the divine child of a supreme state god, Khonsu possessed both a youthful, regenerative aspect, and a potent oracular authority that became central to civic, judicial, and royal legitimacy during the late New Kingdom and subsequent eras. The architectural development of the complex spans more than a millennium of active construction and religious usage. Primary construction of the standing temple was initiated during the Twentieth Dynasty under Pharaoh Ramesses III, who established the core sanctuary, ambulatory, and inner chapels. The structure of the temple was systematically expanded through the end of the Ramesside period and into the Third Intermediate Period, most notably under the authority of the High Priests of Amun, including Herihor and Pinedjem I, who carried out the extensive decorative and architectural programs across the hypostyle hall, peristyle court, and pylon. Subsequent structural additions, processional portals, enclosure walls, and secondary chapels were appended across the Late Period, the Thirtieth Dynasty, and the Ptolemaic Dynasty. Following post-pharaonic Christian usage in Late Antiquity, the monument became the focus of major twenty-first century conservation and digital documentation campaigns by the American Research Center in Egypt (ARCE) and the Egyptian Ministry of Tourism and Antiquities, featuring extensive polychrome relief cleaning, masonry consolidation, field school training, and 3D laser scanning.

== Topography and foundation engineering ==
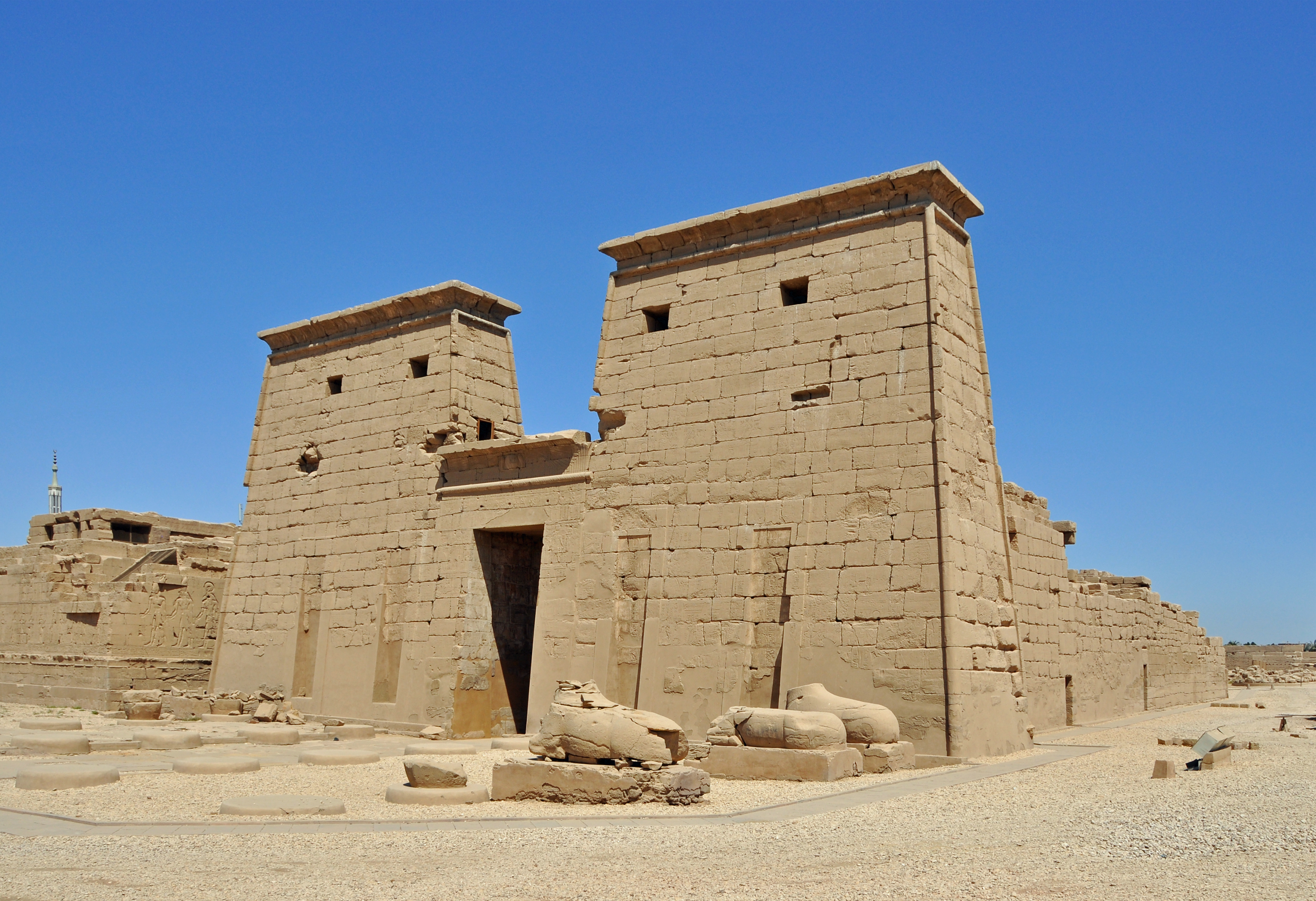
Entrance to the Temple of Khonsu

Ancient Egyptian temple construction was not merely a mechanical building project, but a continuous ritual performance designed to recreate the divine universe at the moment of creation. The physical engineering techniques visible at the Temple of Khonsu, from the deep foundation trenching to the artificial sand layering, were directly dictated by sacred ritual prescriptions. Because sacred texts required the sanctuary to rise from the primordial creation waters of Nun, ancient builders adapted their structural methods to meet religious mandates when physical groundwater could not be reached.

=== Elevated mound topography ===
The Temple of Khonsu was deliberately constructed on an artificially elevated earth-and-stone mound (surélévation) to raise the sacred structure above the surrounded flood plain and adjacent temple structures. Topographical and altimetric surveys demonstrate a deliberate upward slope along the main south-to-north axial line of the temple. The open forecourt rests at an elevation of 76.50 m, whereas the innermost northern sanctuary core reaches an elevation of 77.30 m. This elevated profile contrasts sharply with the floor elevation of the neighboring Great Hypostyle Hall of Amun-Re, which sits lower at 74.00 m. Architecturally and mythologically, this progressive axial incline physically manifested in the emergence of the sacred primeval mound (benben) from the receded primordial waters, ensuring that the inner sanctum occupied the most elevated and cosmologically pure terrain within the sacred space.

=== Trench excavation and sand substitution ===
The engineering of the temple foundations entailed the excavation of continuous perimeter and wall trenches extended to a depth of 2.90 m into the natural soil. During foundation preparations, moist Nilotic silt and river sand encountered within the deep trenches were systematically removed and replaced with clean, dry, yellow desert sand brought from the high desert wadis (area that is dry except during inundation season). Beyond providing a stable, water-drained engineering bed designed to mitigate capillary action and masonry erosion, this substitution constituted a vital ritual purification. The most important desert sand represented the unapproachable, untamed primeval waters of Nun, isolating the temple masonry from mundane soil and ritually preparing the ground for the divine presence.

=== Axis alignment and mechanical installations ===
Deep excavations beneath the courtyard floor uncovered mud brick installations containing post cavities positioned precisely along the central axis of the temple and pylon. These physical remains represent sighting poles used by ancient surveyors during the ritual of the "Stretching of the Cord" (pedj-shes) to establish architectural alignments during superstructure construction. The axial sight lines ensured precise alignment with both geographical features and processional axises leading toward the Luxor temple and the Nile. During construction, the vertical joints between stone ashlar blocks were coated with a specialized plaster sealant (besen). Stonecutters chiseled specialized lever notches and mechanical mortises into the upper surfaces of architraves, allowing builders to maneuver and lower multi-ton stone blocks into position using wooden levers and sledges.

=== Foundation deposits ===
Physical foundation deposits discovered in situ beneath the northern exterior corners contained white and blue faience beads, porcelain amulets, sacrificed animal bones, and miniature bronze construction tools like adzes and chisels. A later Twenty-Fifth Dynasty deposit beneath the Taharqa colonnade on the forecourt contained an inscribed faience plaque of King Taharqa, miniature bronze axes, ceramic vessels, and scattered stone beads. Structural finishing details preserved in the masonry include thick plaster coatings applied to interior walls before relief carving, and physical lever notches carved into architraves to align heavy stone roofing slabs.

== Architectural layout ==
=== Architectural components ===
The ground plan of the Temple of Khonsu exhibits a classical New Kingdom axial layout, characterized by a progressive transition from broad, well-lit public spaces, to constricted, dark inner sanctums.

1. Dromos (Avenue of Rams), Quay and Enclosure Gateways:
  Avenue of Rams
  - Dromos: A paved avenue lined with 2.8 m of seated sandstone rams. Although bearing the cartouches of High Priest/King Pinedjem I, these statues were originally sculpted under Amenhotep III and relocated to flank the approach to Khonsu.
  - Dedicated Quay and Canal Basin: A stone quay at the dromos terminus connecting the temple via canal to the Nile for water-borne festivals.
  - Bab el-Amara Gateway: A monumental 21 m high portal constructed under Ptolemy III Euergetes I along the southern enclosure wall.
  - Southwest Enclosure Portal/Chapel: A small sandstone chapel (1.26 m x 0.64 m) embedded in the 21 m high mud brick enclosure wall built by Nectanebo I, serving as a processional way-station for Khonsu's bark voyage to the Mound of Djeme.
2. First Pylon and Entrance Portal
  - Pylon Façade: A massive twin-towered sandstone pylon (32 m wide) featuring four vertical flagstaff grooves. Construction was initiated under Ramesses III/XI and completed by Pinedjem I, who added dedicatory inscriptions on the facade jambs.
  - Passage and Ceiling Reveals: Entrance passage decorated with processional Nile gods (Hapi) bringing gifts.
3. Peristyle Courtyard (Court of Herihor)
  - Colonnade: A spacious peristyle court surrounded on four sides by 28 papyrus-shaft columns forming an elevated northern portico.
  - Dual Relief Carving Styles: Wall scenes west of the main central axis are executed in raised relief, whereas wall scenes east and all column shafts are carved in sunken relief.
  - Reused Blocks (Spoila): Recycled 18th Dynasty blocks embedded in court walls, including an Amenhotep III royal jubilee block revealed beneath flaking wall plaster.
  - Second Pylon Relief: A detailed architectural depiction on the east wall portraying the façade of the Second Pylon of the main Temple of Amun-Re at Karnak, complete with 8 painted flagstaffs dedicated to individual goddesses.
4. Transverse First Hypostyle Hall
  - Hypostyle Columns and Clerestory: A transverse hall containing 8 papyrus columns; 4 central open-papyrus columns forming a higher nave with stone clerestory grilles, flanked by 4 lateral closed-bud papyrus columns.
  - Reused Column Drum: Column 3 in the eastern colonnade contains an 18th Dynasty column drum bearing the double cartouche of Horemheb hidden beneath later plaster.
  - Architectural Spoila: An 18th Dynasty lintel block of Thutmosis IV reused above the hypostyle doorway.
  - Ptolemaic Lunar/Zodiac Relief: Ceiling and cornice additions by Cleopatra III and Ptolemy IX Soter II depicting a Double Ennead worshipping the lunar disk.
5. Ambulatory and Sacred Bark Shrine
  - Bark Shrine Structure: A central oblong sandstone shrine open at both north and south ends to allow passage of the portable sacred bark of Khonsu during processions.
  - Granite Resting Socle: A central red granite pedestaled socle where the sacred bark was set down by bearing priests for daily rituals.
  - Surrounding Ambulatory: A covered corridor encircling the bark shrine, giving access to the rear chapels.
6. Inner Sanctuary Chapels and Roof Suite
  - Chapel Suite: 12 surrounding chapels and sacristies arranged off the ambulatory and rear hypostyle hall for storing cult implements, libation vessels, and divine vestments.
  - Northern Rear Sanctuary: The innermost Holy of Holies housing the fixed cult statue of Khonsu.
  - Roof Staircase and Coptic Layer: A stone staircase leading from chapel rooms to the roof terrace, where Coptic Christian cross carvings, Greek/Coptic graffiti invoking St. Peter and St. Paul, and a 3-boat pilgrimage graffiti document Late Antique Christian transformation.

Entrance to one of the chapels of the Temple of Khonsu.

== Sequential construction phases ==
Phase I: The Twentieth Dynasty Core (Ramesses III) The foundational nucleus of the present temple was constructed during the reign of Ramesses III in the Twentieth Dynasty. This initial building phase established the primary limestone and sandstone masonry core, including the bark shrine ambulatory, the rear peripheral chapels, and the immediate vestibule chambers.

Phase II: Hypostyle Hall Expansion (Ramesses XI) Under the reign of Ramesses XI, the architectural layout was extended southward through the construction and epigraphic decoration of the 8-column hypostyle hall immediately adjoining the central sanctuary core.

Phase III: High Priests of Amun Decorative and Building Program (Herihor and Pinedjem I I) During the transition from the New Kingdom to the Third Intermediate Period, effective political power in Thebes shifted to the High priests of Amun. High Priest Herihor executed a comprehensive decorative program throughout the 28-column peristyle court, inscribing its walls and column shafts. Subsequently, High Priest Pinedjem I I directed construction and relief decoration of the monumental entrance Pylon and its central granite portal.

Phase IV: Late Period, Thirtieth Dynasty, and Ptolemaic Modifications In subsequent centuries, the complex received continuous architectural additions. Rulers of the Thirtieth Dynasty, particularly Nectanebo I, and monarchs of the Ptolemaic Dynasty added exterior screening walls, monumental stone gateways, and surrounding enclosure wall infrastructure.

== Later history, oracular function, and Christian reuse ==
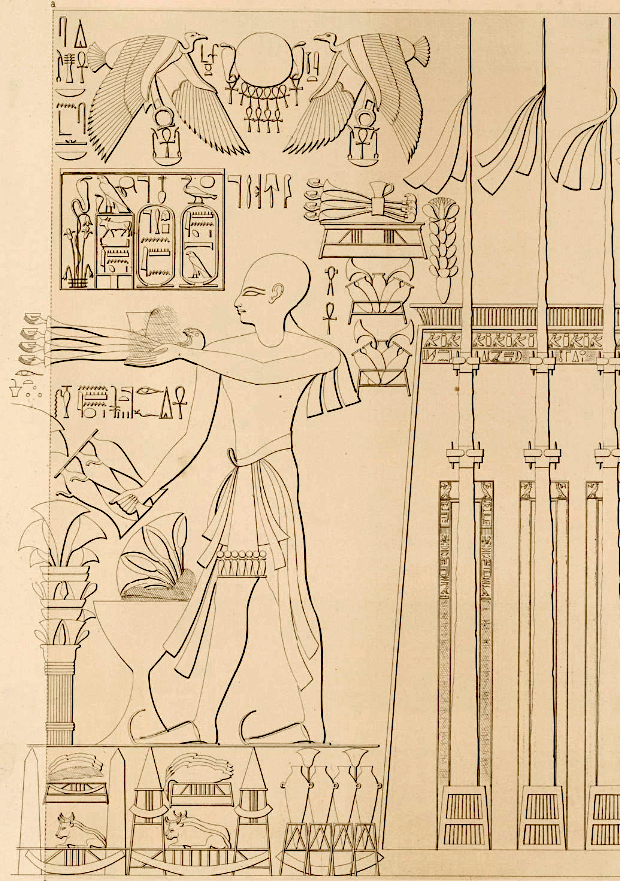
Drawing of the Theban High Priest of Amun Herihor, depicted on a relief from the Temple of Khonsu.

=== Third Intermediate Period administrative and oracular center ===
Throughout the Third intermediate period, the Temple of Khonsu functioned as a primary administrative, legal, and oracular center for the Theban Region. The state god's local manifestation, Khonsu-in-Thebes Neferhotep, was routinely consulted to settle legal disputes, confirm property transfers, and endorse political appointments. These oracular decrees were issued before the divine bark and formally recorded as public legal texts directly onto the temple's sandstone wall surfaces.

The political transformation of the High Priesthood of Amun is vividly illustrated on these walls. When Herihor assumed full pharaonic cartouches while serving as High Priest, he utilized the temple's decorative space to legitimize the de facto independence of the Theban sacerdotal state from the Twenty-first Dynasty monarchs ruling from Tanis. The continued political centrality of the temple is further underscored by political graffiti carved onto the masonry, including an official public text dated to the reign of the Libyan pharaoh Osorkon I.

=== Late antique Coptic Christian transformation ===
In Late Antiquity, following the Roman Empire's proscription of pagan cults, the temple underwent structural adaptation when Coptic Christians converted the ancient inner sanctuary into a Christian chapel. Physical alterations and Christian epigraphy were appended throughout the structure.

- Chiseled Coptic crosses were systematically carved over pharaonic figures and relief scenes.
- Devotional graffiti invoking Saint Peter and Saint Paul were inscribed onto stone wall panels.
- Incised devotional graffiti representing sacred bark or riverine transport vessels was carved along the stone staircases leading to the temple roof by Christian pilgrims.

== Twenty-first century conservation ==
In the twenty-first century, the Temple of Khonsu became the focus of major international conservation and digital documentation initiatives aimed at stabilizing its structural elements and preserving its fragile painted walls.

=== ARCE and USAID conservation campaigns (2008-2018) ===
Between 2008 and 2018, the American Research Center in Egypt (ARCE), funded by the United States Agency for International Development (USAID) and working in partnership with the Egyptian Ministry of Tourism and Antiquities, conducted a ten-year conservation project at the site. The initiative was structured around hands-on conservation field schools that trained Egyptian Ministry conservators while undertaking systematic physical restoration across the monument.

The primary focus of this ten-year campaign was the consolidation, cleaning, and chemical stabilization of surviving polychrome painted reliefs across six of the temple's twelve interior chapels. Project activities also included:

- Structural stabilization and repointing of deteriorated sandstone masonry on the exterior temple walls.
- Re-laying and structural consolidation of heavily decayed floor paving blocks inside the interior halls and sanctuaries.
- A technical photography field school led by ARCE photographer Ayman Damarany, which trained Ministry inspectors in high-resolution heritage documentation.

In September 2019, ARCE, USAID, and the Ministry of Tourism and Antiquities held a joint promotional event in Luxor to highlight the completed conservation work alongside a sister project at Dra Abu El Naga.

=== 3D Digital documentation and multi-year restoration (2021-present) ===
Beginning in late 2021, ARCE launched a comprehensive multi-year follow-up conservation campaign with authorization from the Ministry of Tourism and Antiquities. The initial phase focused on total spacial and epigraphic documentation using 3D laser scanning technology to create high-precision digital models of the entire temple. Scheduled as a multi-year project, the secondary campaign prioritizes:

- Advanced structural repairs and stone consolidation across high-risk masonry zones.
- Systematic conservation and cleaning of the remaining untreated polychrome painted reliefs across the un-restored chapels, hypostyle hall, and peristyle court.
- Advanced field school training in site management and preventive conservation for local conservators.

== Bibliography ==
- Blyth, Elizabeth. Karnak: Evolution of a Temple. Routledge, 2006.
- “Conservation Field School at the Temple of Khonsu.” ARCE, 11 Feb. 2023, arce.org/project/conservation-field-school-temple-khonsu/.
- Laroche-Traunecker, Françoise. "Les rituels de construction des temples égyptiens. Gestes représentés sur les parois et actes attestés par des fouilles à Karnak." Archimède: Archéologie et histoire ancienne, no. 7, 2020, pp. 76–96.
- The Epigraphic Survey. The Temple of Khonsu, Volume 1: Scenes of King Herihor in the Court, with Translations of Texts. Oriental Institute Publications, vol. 100, The Oriental Institute of the University of Chicago, 1979.
- The Epigraphic Survey. The Temple of Khonsu, Volume 2: Scenes and Inscriptions in the Court and the First Hypostyle Hall, with Translations of Texts and Glossary for Volumes 1 and 2. Oriental Institute Publications, vol. 103, The Oriental Institute of the University of Chicago, 1981.

== Gallery of images ==
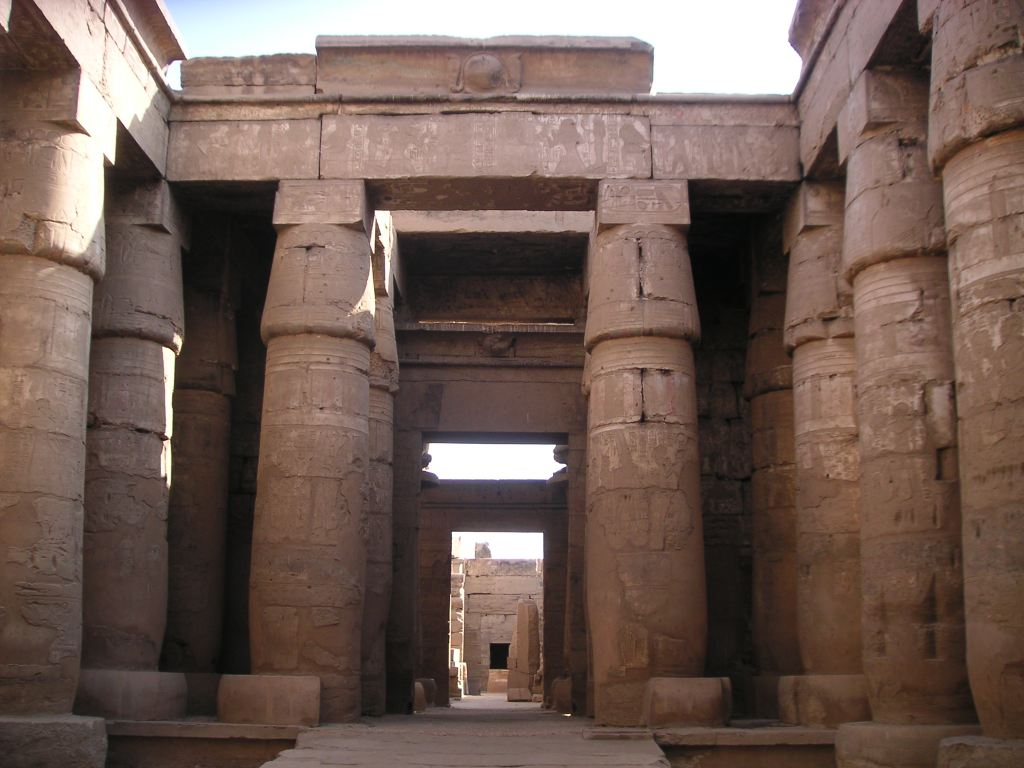

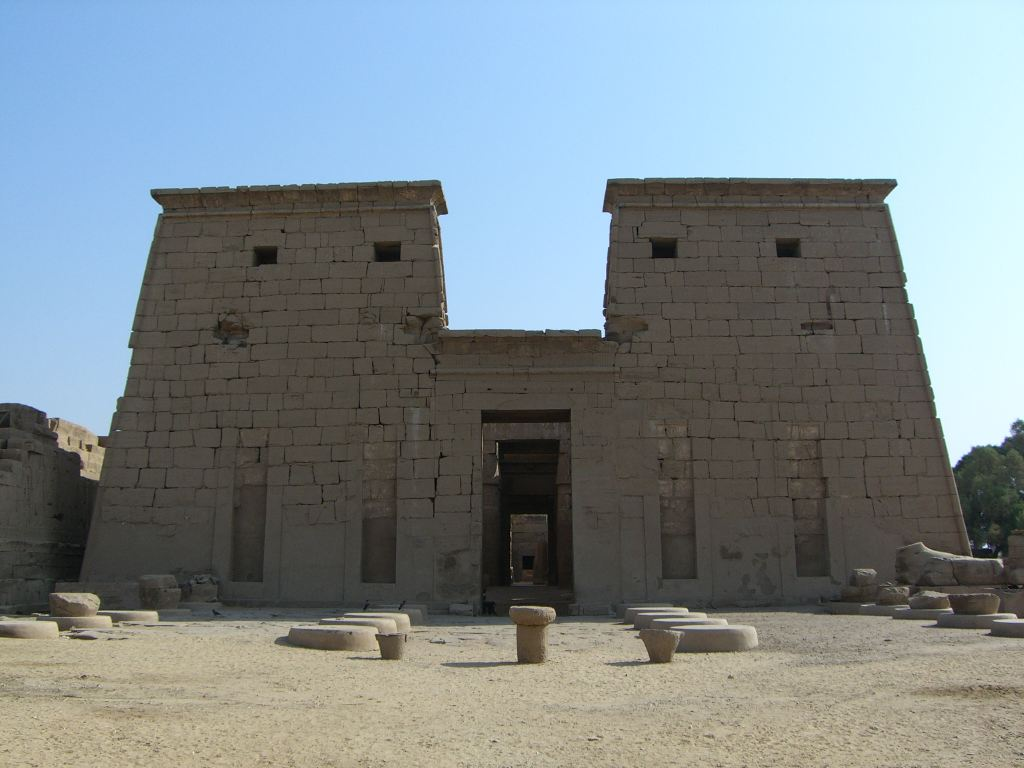

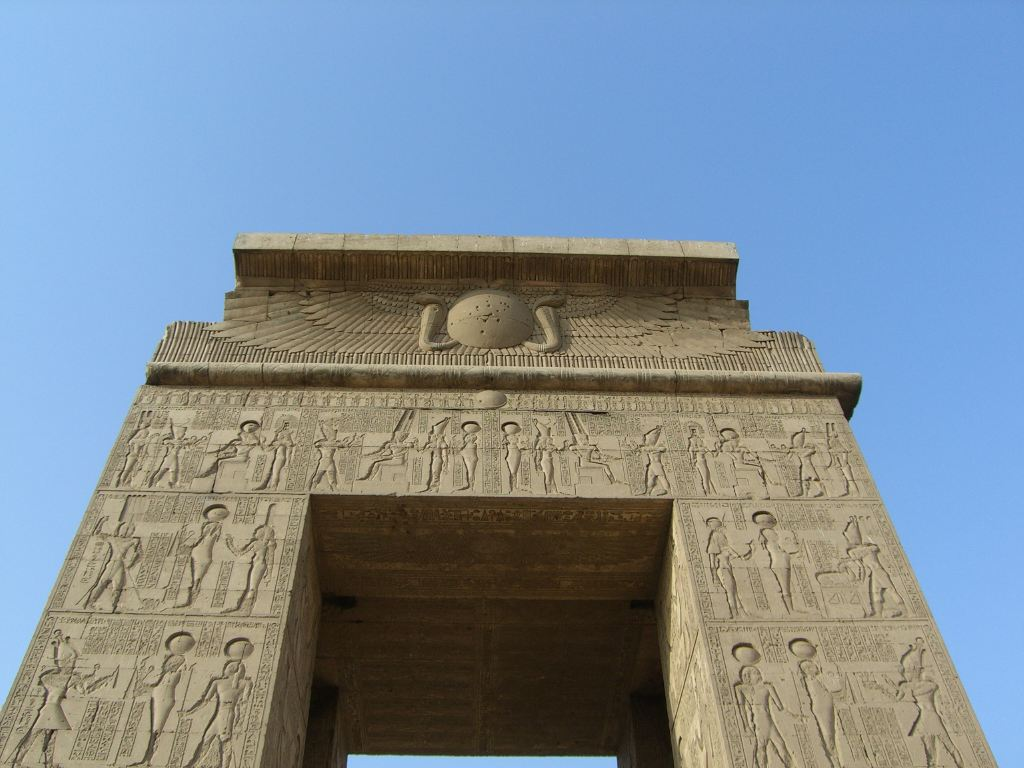

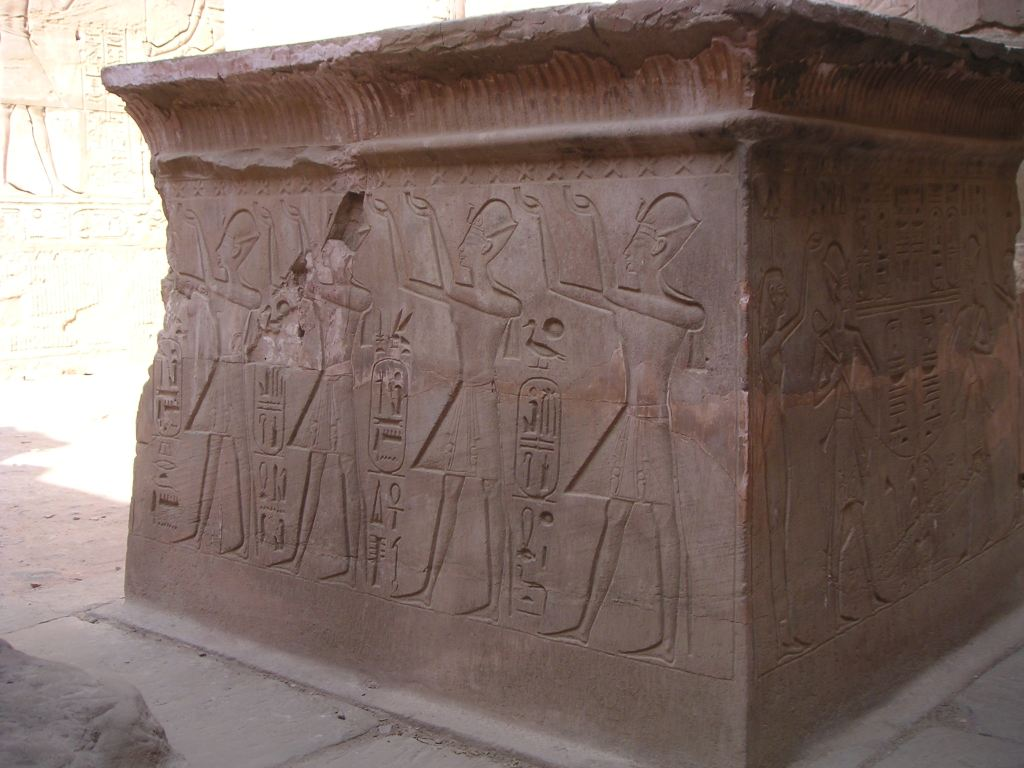

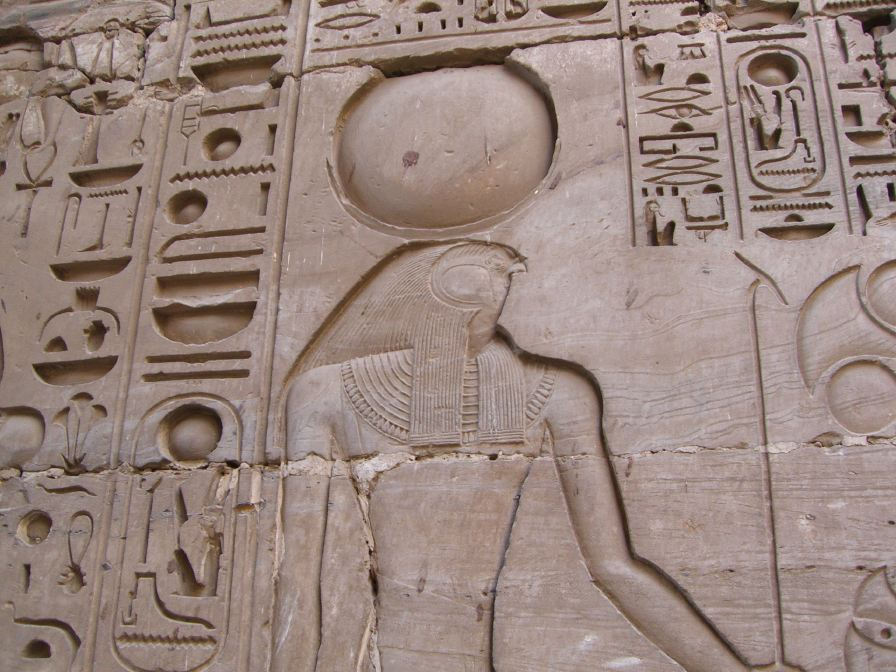

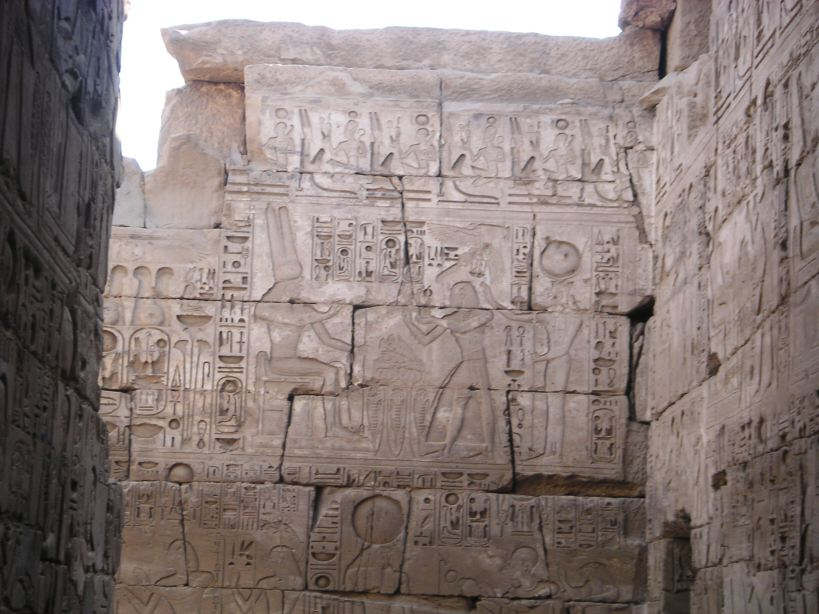

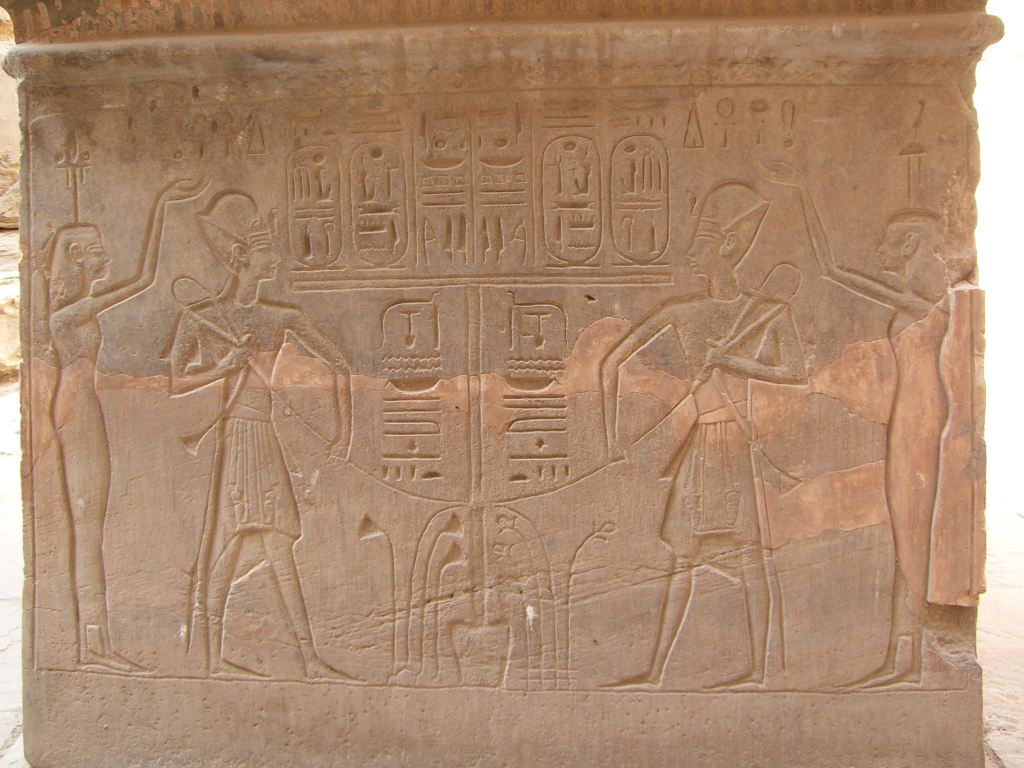

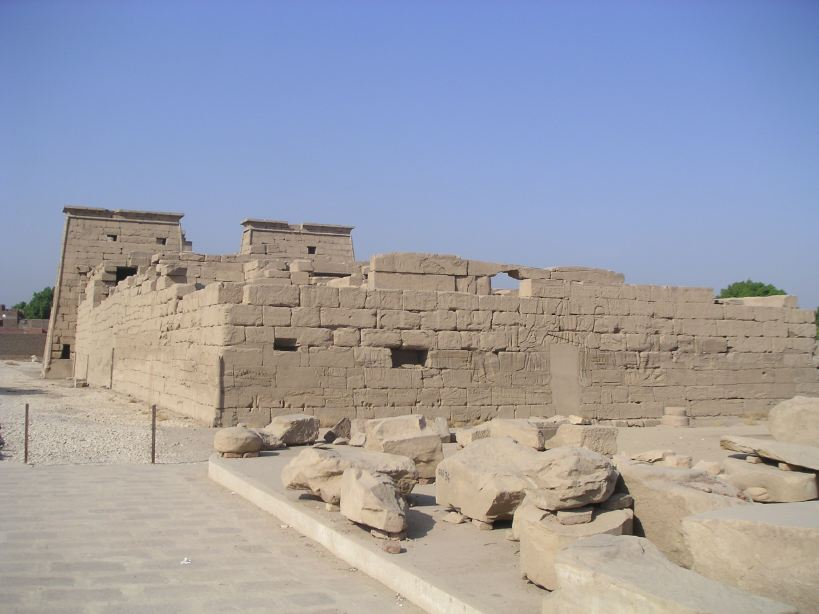

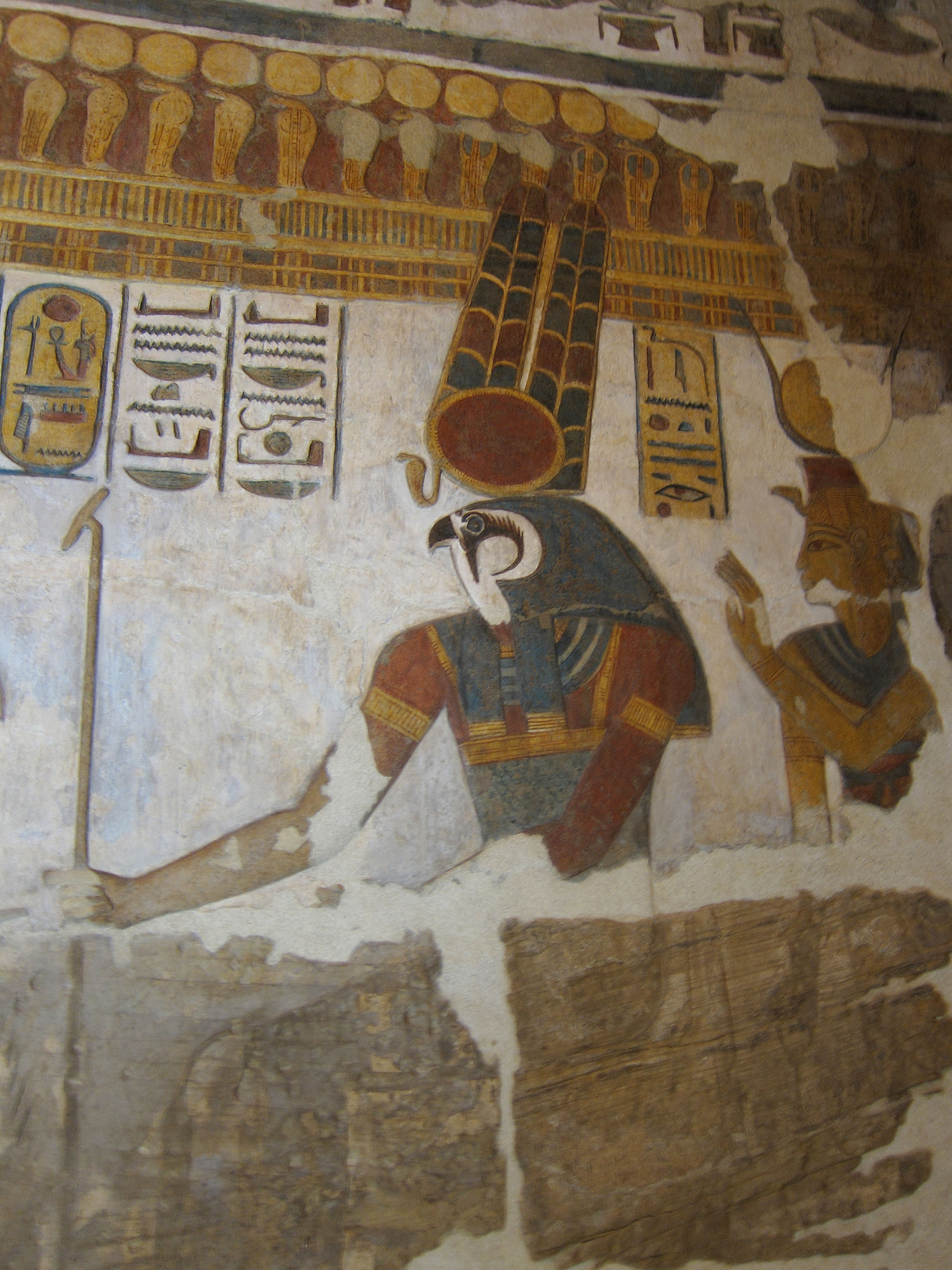
