= Wilbour Papyrus =

Largest known non-funerary papyrus from Ancient Egypt

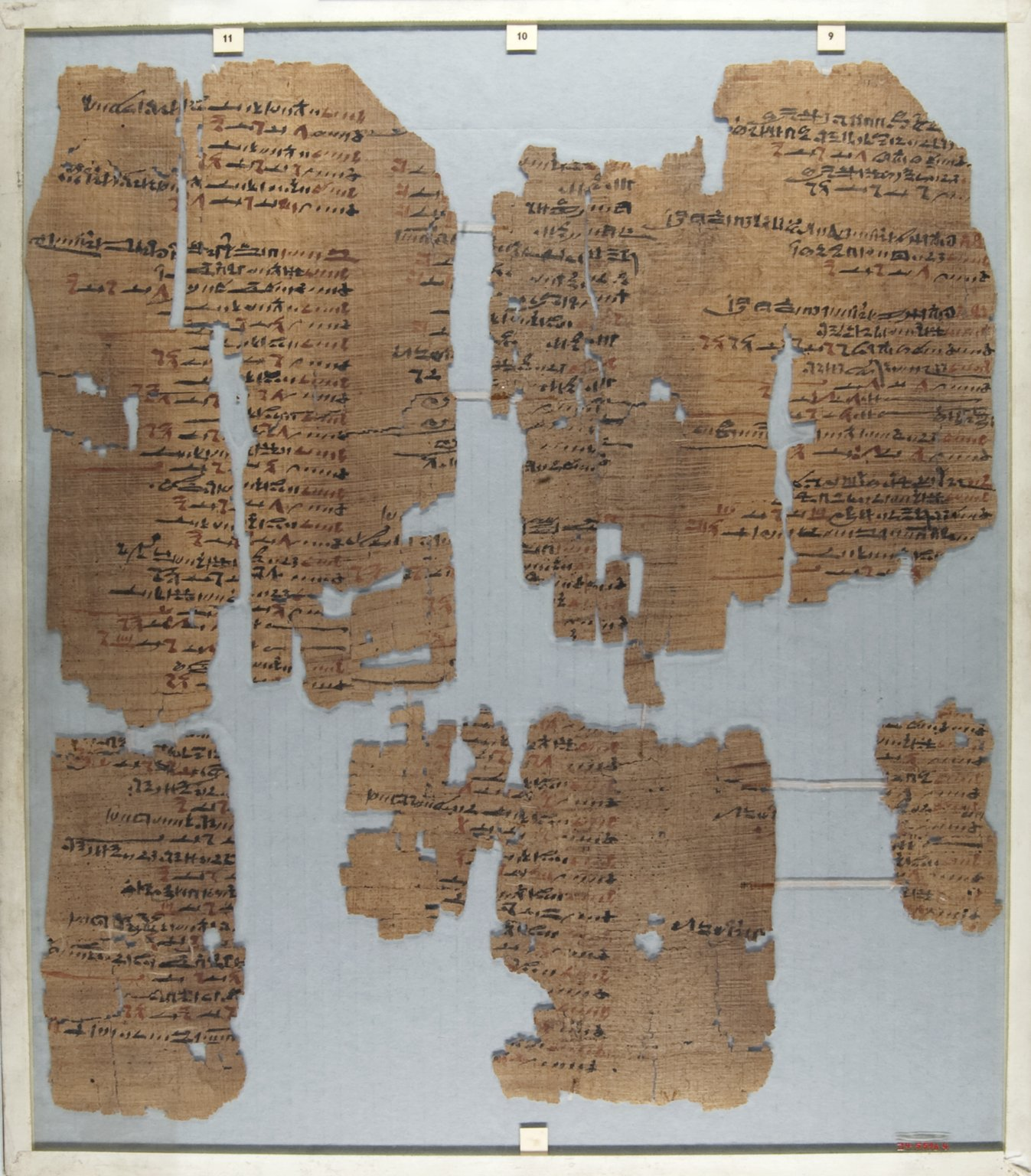
- A piece of the Wilbour Papyrus in the Brooklyn Museum (c. 2010)
- Size: length: 10 meters
- Created: c. 1145 BC
- Discovered: Aswan, Aswan Governorate, Egypt
- Present location: New York City, New York, United States

The Wilbour Papyrus, named after the New York journalist who acquired it, Charles Edwin Wilbour, is the largest known non-funerary papyrus from Ancient Egypt. It is an administrative document which contains a survey of cultivatable lands in the late Ramesside Period of the New Kingdom of Egypt. The papyrus is 10 meters long and divided into two sections, text A and text B. Text A contains an extensive account of lands both privately and collectively owned. Text B is much shorter and contains an account of exclusively royal lands. The Wilbour Papyrus is a rare case of a well preserved look into the economic administration of Ancient Egypt. Egyptologists have been able to use it to produce a more complete analysis of the function of the Ancient Egyptian state.

== History of the Papyrus ==
The Papyrus was created in 1140s BCE, the 4th year of the reign of Ramesses V. It may not be the original copy of the survey, instead it may have been created as an archival copy. Between its creation and discovery, most of the first section of the papyrus was lost due to decomposition. Charles Edwin Wilbour purchased seventeen papyri from a farmer when he visited the island of Elephantine near Aswan in 1893. Among these was the Wilbour Papyrus. When he died in a hotel in Paris in 1896, his belongings, which included the Wilbour, Brooklyn and Elephantine papyri, were put in storage by the hotel. When Wilbour's property was returned to his family, nearly half a century later, his widow donated the papyri to the Brooklyn Museum. The Wilbour Papyrus translated by for the Brooklyn Museum by Alan Gardiner in 1941. After its translation, there has been extensive writing done about the document by Egyptologists. As of 2023, it remains in storage at the museum, not on display.

== Content and purpose ==
The Wilbour Papyrus contains a large amount of data collected about cultivatable land. The area surveyed is not known with complete accuracy but it begins at The Faiyum and ends near Tihna (near Minya in the modern day), a distance of approximately 140 kilometers. Within the region surveyed, the papyrus contains data for only 4,630 hectares of the approximately 150,000 hectares that would have been arable at the time. Text A is a ledger containing a list of names and occupations of the holders of plots of land. It is divided into 4 sections, the first of which has been lost to damage. Section 2 begins with “year 4, [second month of the Inundation-season], day 15 to day 20, making six days, assessment made by (unknown)”, "year 4" and "[inundation-season]" referring to the summer of the 4th year of the reign of Ramesses V, which has allowed Egyptologists to date the document to around 1145 BCE, but the specificity varies between 1140 BCE and 1150 BCE. Text B documents the cultivatable khato-land (translated to crown-land) of the Pharaoh in the surveyed region. It, unlike Text A, documents the grain yields of the land and where they were collected to.

=== Text A ===
The first section of the Wilbour Papyrus is primarily related to taxation. More specifically, it functioned as land surveys, or dnἰt for the different lands in Egypt. Text A includes some royal lands as well, but it only accounts for those specifically in Middle Egypt. However, in the 20th dynasty, under Ramesses V, there were certain situations where landowners would not have been mentioned in their prospective categories of the Wilbour Papyrus. For example, veterans were given plots that could have been from royal land or temples, but these records might have remained registered in Text A, instead of Text B, which includes royal land records.

=== Text B ===
The second section of the Wilbour Papyrus is primarily related to the royal lands of Ancient Egypt. Text B is significantly smaller than Text A, but it was written much earlier. While Text A does have specific royal lands included in its records, Text B is more focused on khato-fields, which are the lands belonging specifically to the Pharaoh. The lands that the Pharaoh or King owned were lands belonging to temples or to other royal institutions. The governmental structures that owned these lands officially were referred to as hwt.

=== Land holders ===
The most numerous occupations of plot-holders in the document are priests (making up 10.6% of the population), soldiers (8.4%), ladies (11.1%), herdsmen (7.7%), stable-masters (17.7%), farmers (8.3%), and scribes (4.3%). The papyrus also lists a significant number of foreigners in its population. It mostly lists Libyans and Near-Easterners, it is possible they were foreign mercenaries who had descendants who settled on farmland in which they obtained for serving in the military. In some cases we see if the person who owned the land had deceased. It would then say the land is being cultivated by the sons or daughters.

=== Land ===
The papyrus breaks the plots of land documented in Text A into four different types. These types are listed as ihwty, m-drt, rowdy, rmnyt. Ihwty were small plots held by individual field laborers, cultivators or tenant farmers. M-drt were plots of land that were held collectively by more than one of this class of people, these two types of plots were generally owned by the lower or middle class. Rwdw meant a plot of land held by an administrator such as a priest and rmnyt were plots held by institutions like temples. Ihwty are thought to have been small plots privately held by individuals while the other three types seem to be larger state holdings of land that were leased to tenets. Ihwty were much smaller plots and had lower quality soil that were expected to produce around 100 litres/hectare (26.5 gallons/hectare) of grain while the larger plots were expected to produce as much as 3000 liters/hectare (792.5 gallons/hectare). Rmnyt land made up a plurality of the arable land in the document, especially those plots held by temples. This has allowed for Egyptologists to estimate that 13 to 18 percent of all of Ancient Egypt's farmland during the Ramesside Period was held by temples.

Wilbour Papyrus
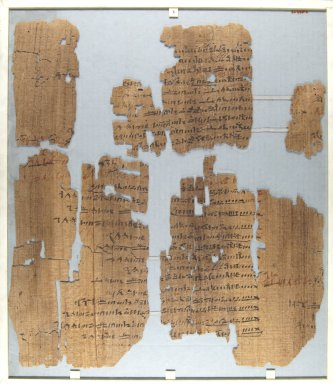
- A piece of the Wilbour Papyrus in the Brooklyn Museum (back of papyrus) (c. 2010)
- Size: length: 10 meters
- Created: c. 1147 BCE
- Discovered: Aswan, Aswan Governorate, Egypt
- Present location: New York City, New York, United States

=== Taxation or rent ===
The purpose of the survey conducted is unclear. What is known is that it documents the exchange of grain between farmers and the state. It is unknown whether or not these exchanges were a tax or a kind of rent or both. The language in the document could imply private ownership of ihwty farms by farmers, meaning the exchange of grain from them to the state would have to be taxes, though at rates far lower than is expected for a grain tax. This low-tax rate could be explained by the expectation that farmers were to give goods like pottery, textiles and other foodstuffs to the state as an additional tax and meant to work in the off season as a corvée labor force as a form of taxation through labor. The alternative, is that these ihwty farms were being rented from the state and their rent was paid as a percentage of grain produced by the land. The larger three types of plots that were worked by field workers paid taxes by turning over 30 percent of their harvest. It is possible that this survey was conducted to evaluate and change the tax or rent rates. It was likely ordered by the "Chief Taxing Master", an official in charge of the financial matters of Egypt.
