= Jacques Vandier =

Jacques Vandier may refer to:

- Jacques Vandier (Egyptologist) (1904–1973), French Egyptologist
- Jacques Vandier (entrepreneur) (1927–2020), French entrepreneur
