= Jeanne Marie Thérèse Vandier d'Abbadie =

French egyptologist

Jeanne Marie Thérèse Vandier d'Abbadie (1899–1977) was a French Egyptologist.

== Biography ==
Born in Nuremberg in 1899, Vandier d'Abbadie grew up in Paris and studied at the École du Louvre under the Egyptologist and conservator Charles Boreux. She then went on to the Institut Catholique de Paris and the Cairo Museum of Antiquities, developing a specialism in archaeological illustration.

Between 1932 and 1936, she and her husband, Egyptologist Jacques Vandier, excavated tombs around the ancient Egyptian village of Deir el-Medineh in the Valley of the Kings, under the auspices of the Institut Français d'Archéologie Orientale. On the basis of this work Vandier d'Abbadie published a volume on the tomb of Kha, and produced illustrations for several other volumes stemming from the expedition.

Returning to Paris in 1939, Vandier d'Abbadie and her mentor Charles Boreux moved the Louvre's Egyptian collections outside of the city for safekeeping for the duration of the Second World War. After the war she continued her work in Egyptology, contributing articles to both scholarly journals and art magazines, as well as assisting her husband, who had taken up Boreux's position as conservator at the Louvre. In 1963 she published a biography of Egyptologist and artist Nestor L'Hôte.

Vandier d'Abbadie died in Neuilly-sur-Seine in 1977. She spent the final years of her life editing and publishing the unfinished work of her husband, who had died four years earlier.

== Bibliography ==
- 1935. (With Jacques Vandier) Tombes de Deir el-Médineh. La tombe de Nefer-abou. Mémoires publiés par les membres de l’Institut français d’archéologie orientale du Caire, no. 69, Institut Français d’Archéologie Orientale (PDF; 83,3 MB); from Institut Français d'Archéologie Orientale (IFAO).
- 1936. A propos d’une chauve-souris sur un ostracon du Musee du Caire. Bulletin de Institut français d’archéologie orientale 36.
- 1936–1959. Catalogue des ostraca figurs de Deir el-Medineh. Fasc. 1–4, in two volumes. Cairo: Institut Français d’Archéologie Orientale.
- 1938. Une fresque civile de Deir el-Medineh. Revue d’Egyptologie 3, pp. 27–35.
- 1939. Deux tombes de Deir el-Médineh. Première Partie: La Chapelle de Khâ. Mémoires publiés par les membres de l’Institut français d’archéologie orientale du Caire, no. 73, Institut Français d’Archéologie Orientale (PDF; 114,6 MB); from Institut Français d'Archéologie Orientale (IFAO).
- 1939. La decouverte d’une nouvelle tombe royale en Egypte. Beaux-Arts 328, April, pp. 117–123.
- 1950. Un monument inédit de Ramses VII au Musée du Louvre. Journal of Near Eastern Studies 9, pp. 134–136.
- 1954. Deux tombes ramessides à Gournet-Mourraï. Mémoires publiés par les membres de l’Institut français d’archéologie orientale du Caire, no. 87, Institut Français d’Archéologie Orientale (PDF; 14,8 MB); from Internet Archive.
- 1963. Nestor L’Hote (1804-1842). Choix de documents conserves a la Biblio Nat. et aux archives du Musee du Louvre. Leiden: Brill.
- 1972. Les objects de Toilette Egyptiens au Musee du Louvre. Paris: Editions des Musees Nationaux.
