= Instructions of Amenemhat =

Literary work

Papyrus Sallier II with hieratic excerpt from the Instructions of Amenemhat. British Museum EA 10182/2.

Instructions of Amenemhat (aka "Teaching of King Amenemhat to His Son Senusret") is a short ancient Egyptian poem of the sebayt genre written during the early Middle Kingdom. The poem takes the form of an intensely dramatic monologue delivered by the ghost of the murdered 12th Dynasty pharaoh Amenemhat I to his son Senusret I. It describes the conspiracy that killed Amenemhat, and enjoins his son to trust no-one. The poem forms a kind of apologia of the deeds of the old king's reign. It ends with an exhortation to Senusret to ascend the throne and rule wisely in Amenemhat's stead.

== Authorship ==
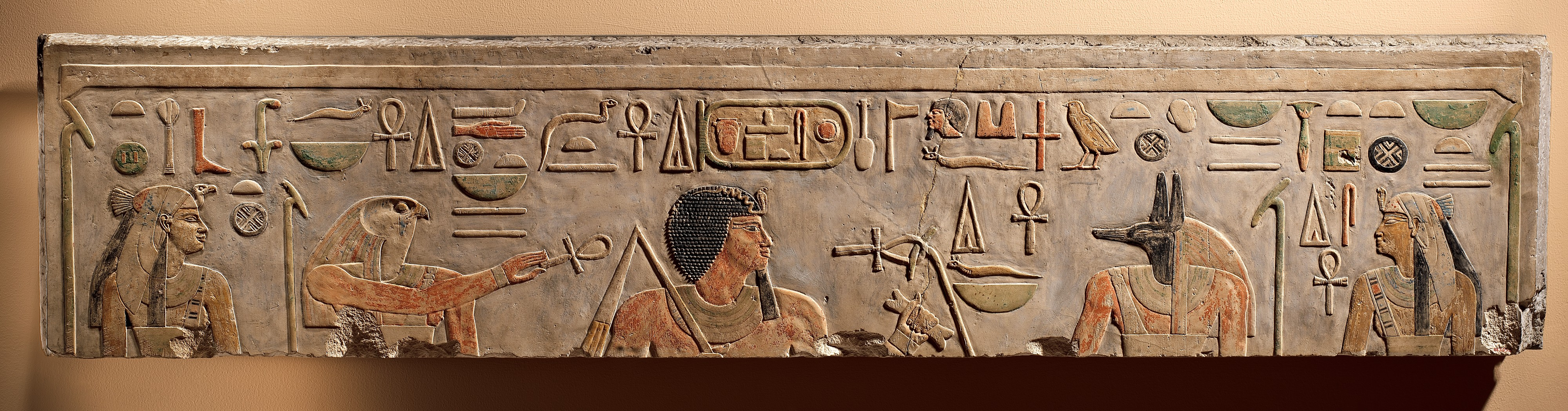
A raised-relief depiction of Amenemhat I accompanied by deities; the death of Amenemhat I is recounted in the Instructions of Amenemhat.

The Instructions may have been authored at Senusret's command to eulogize his father and legitimize his claim to the throne as it is historically attested that a civil war broke out after Amenemhat's assassination and that Senusret was forced to brutally suppress seditious forces aligned against him. Several centuries later, in the New Kingdom Papyrus Chester Beatty IV, the authorship of the poem was attributed to "the foremost of scribes" Kheti.

== Content ==
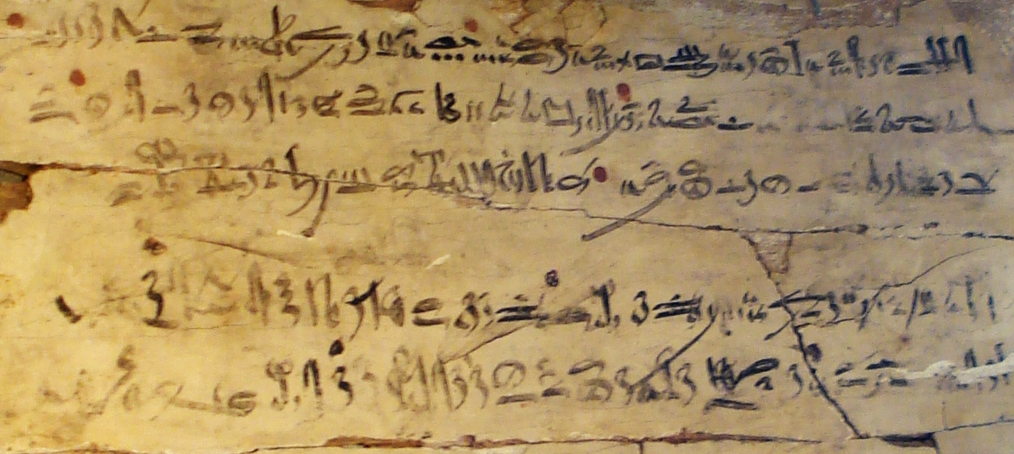
Exercise tablet with hieratic excerpt from the Instructions of Amenemhat. 18th Dynasty, reign of Amenhotep I, ca. 1514-1493 BC. Text reads: "Be on your guard against all who are subordinate to you ... Trust no brother, know no friend, make no friends. There's no point."

The Instructions open by identifying the author as "the Osiris King of Upper and Lower Egypt, Sehetepibre, the son of Re Amenemhat" (i.e. Amenemhat I) and claim to be Amenemhat's advice to his son "the Horus, Lord of All, Kheperkare" (i.e. Senusret I) on how to maintain his kingship and prosperity. The ghost of Amenemhat then warns his son not to trust anyone, friends or siblings, for even those he had helped in the past had refused support and explains that he was assassinated by his bodyguards while he was in bed. He briefly describes his provisions for Egypt; his military successes and his building accomplishments are given. The Instructions close with blessings for his son, Senusret, and advice on how he should rule as sole pharaoh.

== Sources ==
The facsimile of the now-lost Papyrus Millingen, which was copied by A. Peyron in 1843.

The principal source of this document comes from the Papyrus Millingen which was copied by A. Peyron in 1843. The original is now lost. Wooden tablets with parts of the Instructions dating to the 18th Dynasty and New Kingdom papyrus fragments and ostraca survive. Most scholars on Egyptian literature agree that the large prevalence of sources indicate a widescale popularity of the Story of Sinuhe and that it had been copied in multitudes.

== Impact ==
This manuscript is one of the earliest references to "Asiatics". Later pharaohs copied parts of older writings to legitimize their deeds. The 25th Dynasty pharaoh Piye copied sections from the Instructions of Amenemhat almost verbatim. The poem was still being read in the fifth century BC, some 1500 years after it was written. It was even copied into Greek as the "Teaching of King Ammenemes I to His Son Sesostris I".

== See also ==
- Conspiracies in ancient Egypt
- Story of Sinuhe

== External ==
Egyptologist Margaret Geoga in interview on the Teaching of Amenemhat

== Bibliography ==
- Translation in R. B. Parkinson, The Tale of Sinuhe and Other Ancient Egyptian Poems. Oxford World's Classics, 1999.
- Stephen Quirke: Egyptian Literature 1800BC: Questions and Readings, London 2004, 127-129 ISBN 0-9547218-6-1 (translation and transcription)
- Miriam Lichtheim: Ancient Egyptian Literature, Vol. I, 1980 University of California Press, pp. 135–138
- Adolf Erman, The Ancient Egyptians: A Sourcebook of Their Writings, Harper & Row 1966
- Leonard H. Lesko, Pharaoh's Workers: The Villagers of Deir El Medina, Cornell University Press 1994, ISBN 0-8014-8143-0
- James P. Allen, Middle Egyptian: An Introduction to the Language and Culture of Hieroglyphs, Cambridge University Press 2000, ISBN 0-521-77483-7
- Wolfgang Kosack: Berliner Hefte zur ägyptischen Literatur 1 - 12: Teil I. 1 - 6/ Teil II. 7 - 12 (2 Bände). Paralleltexte in Hieroglyphen mit Einführungen und Übersetzung. Heft 9: Die Lehre des Königs Amenemhet I. an seinen Sohn. Verlag Christoph Brunner, Basel 2015. ISBN 978-3-906206-11-0.
