= Macif =

French insurance company

MACIF logo

MACIF (Mutuelle assurance des commerçants et industriels de France et des cadres et des salariés de l'industrie et du commerce) is a French mutual insurance company. It was founded in 1960 in Niort.

It is a member of Euresa, an international "business club" of mutual and cooperative insurance groups.

== History ==
Macif, the Mutual Insurance Company for Traders and Industrialists of France, as well as Executives and Employees in Industry and Commerce, was founded on April 30, 1960, as a mutual insurance company.

In 1968, Socram Banque was founded by several property and casualty insurance mutuals to distribute auto loans.

In the 1970s, MACIF was among the first insurers to offer policies for pleasure boats.

In 1979, MACIF partnered with several mutual insurance companies to create Mutavie, a service offering savings and retirement products.

In 1981, Inter Mutuelles Assistance (IMA) was created.

In 1993, the Macif Foundation was created under the initiative of Jean Simonnet. It was one of the first corporate foundations in France.

In 1997, Macif Gestion, which manages the group's investment activities, particularly its socially responsible funds, was created. The entity was struck off (or dissolved) on July 23, 2014. When its founder Jacques Vandier (1927–2020) retired in 1997 he asserted that it was the largest mutual motor insurance company in France: "Je suis parti de zéro. Avec quelques autres, j'ai fait de la Macif la première mutuelle d'assurances automobile en France." ("I started from zero. With a few others, I made Macif the first mutual car insurance company in France").

In 2005, Macif, Maif, and the Caisse d'Épargne group entered into a partnership.

In 2010, the mutual insurer launched its banking activity: Socram Banque.

In June 2011, the mutual adopted a new group governance charter in Clermont-Ferrand.

In 2014, Matmut and Macif created the joint entity Inter Mutuelles Entreprises, specializing in corporate risk management. In 2016, Macif and Matmut announced the end of discussions to form a single group.

In January 2021, Macif and Aésio announced the creation of Aéma Groupe, an entity born out of the merger between the two mutual insurers. This merger around a mutual insurance group company brings together 800 agencies and over 14,000 employees.

In 2023, Macif acquired Mondial Pare-brise.

In 2025, Macif announced the creation of its reinsurance company, M Réassurance, registered in Luxembourg.

In 2026, through its Macif Terre et Vivant fund, Macif invested in Recyclivre, an online second-hand book retailer.

== Governance ==
=== Executive Management ===
Jean-Philippe Dogneton (CEO): since 2021.

== Sponsoring ==
Macif is participating in the Transat Café l’Or with its boat, Macif Santé Prévoyance.
