= House of life in Ancient Egypt =

Institution or place of education

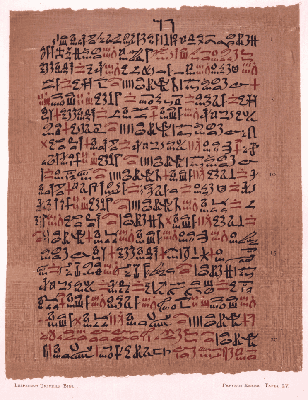
Ebers Papyrus of the National Library of Medicine

The house of life (Per Ânkh𓉑) refers, in ancient Egypt, to both an institution and a place of school education.

In ancient Egypt, there were two distinct places of instruction where the offspring of the elites, officials and clergy could go to receive an education adapted to their social rank. The House of Life (per ânkh, in Egyptian transliterated pr-ˁnḫ), under the protection of the god Thoth, is - with the Egyptian school - one of these two places of reception. This institution is characterized by the fact that it is administratively and architecturally integrated into an important temple.

== History ==
The first mentions of the House of Life are found on two royal decrees dating from the Old Kingdom. From an archaeological point of view, however, only two Houses of Life have been identified to date. Both dating from the New Kingdom, one was discovered at Tell el-Amarna. the capital of King Akhenaten, and the other was unearthed at the Ramesseum. the Temple of Millions of Years of Ramesses II, on the west bank of Thebes. Texts and also the titles of officials tell us that there were also Houses of Life at Abydos, Deir el-Bersha, Tell Basta, Sais, Heliopolis, Memphis, Akhmim, Coptos, Esna, Edfu, and probably in every Temple of Millions of Years in the Theban region, but archaeologists have not yet discovered their exact location.

== Application ==
The Houses of Life in relation to the great religious centers seem to have rather offered the training of the elite destined for intellectual professions such as astronomers, doctors, veterinarians, diplomats, architects, translators or even theologians. Moreover, some Houses of Life developed particular specialties in fields that made them reference centers throughout the country. The Houses of Life on the west bank of Thebes seem to have rather had the vocation to respond to very specific needs consisting of a transmission of the knowledge necessary for the perpetuation of the economic, administrative, artistic and religious life of the temples of millions of years.

In Greco-Roman times, the term "House of Life" more broadly referred to a library where precious papyri were kept. In the game of Senet, square 15 is the House of Life: it is the return square when a pawn lands on square 27 (House of Water).
