= Jacques Vandier (entrepreneur) =

French entrepreneur (1927–2020)

- Born: April 1, 1927; Niort, France
- Died: 30 March 2020 (aged 92)
- Occupation: Entrepreneur

Jacques Vandier (1 April 1927 – 30 March 2020) was a French entrepreneur. He strongly promoted mutualism in France, and was nicknamed the "pope of mutualism".

== History ==
He directed MACIF for 37 years, and served as a member of the French Economic, Social and Environmental Council from 1989 to 1994 and was a Regional Councillor for Poitou-Charentes from 1992 to 1998.

== Distinctions ==
- Knight of the Legion of Honour
- Commander of the Ordre national du Mérite
