= Jacques Vandier (Egyptologist) =

French Egyptologist (1904–1973)

Jacques Vandier (28 October 1904 – 15 October 1973) was a French Egyptologist.

He was the husband of the Egyptologist Jeanne Marie Thérèse Vandier d'Abbadie.
