= Tyti =

- Great Royal Wife, King's Daughter; King's Sister, King's Mother
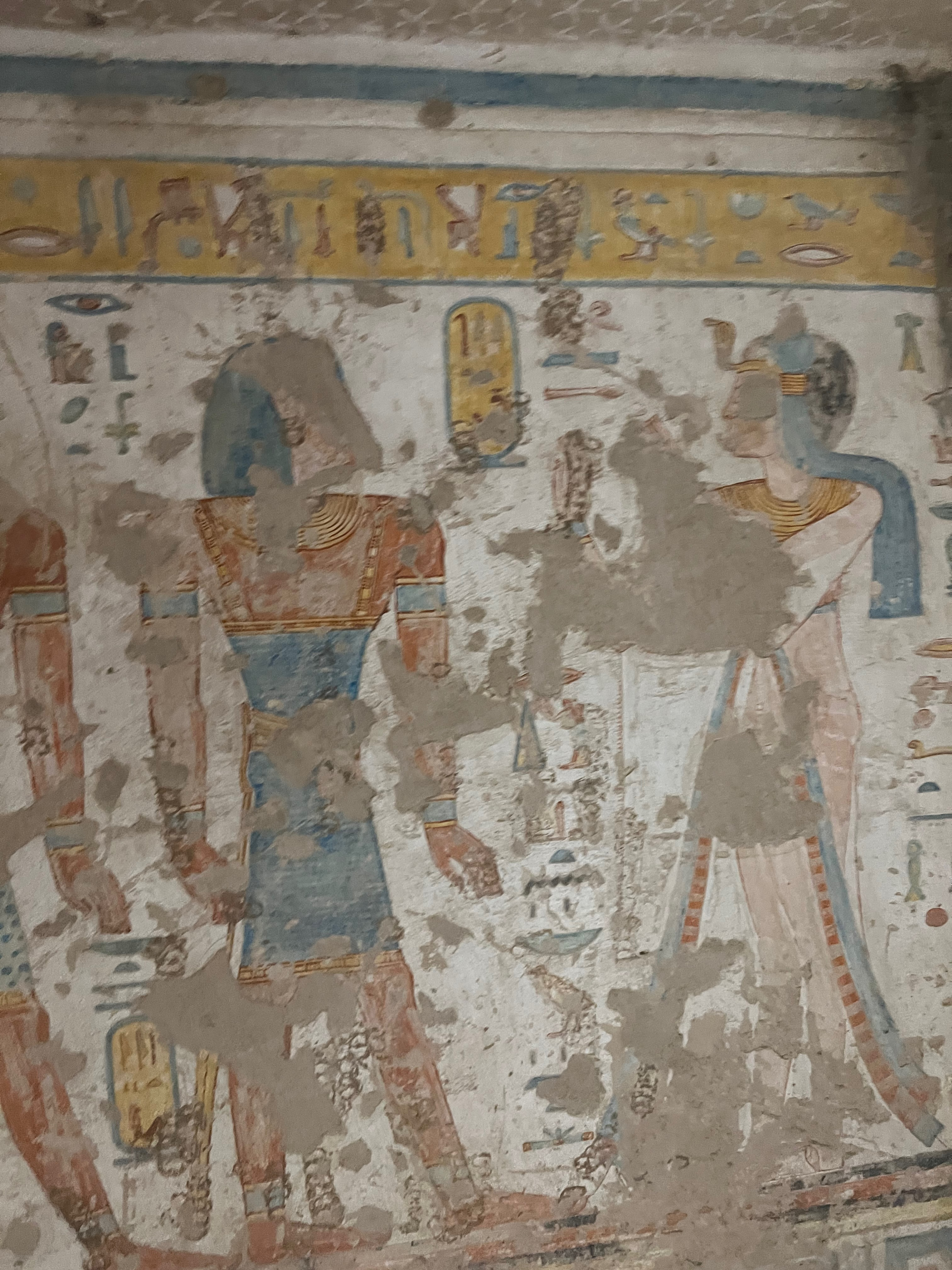
- Tyti depicted in her tomb QV52
- Burial: QV52, Valley of the Queens
- Spouse: Ramesses III
- Issue: Ramesses IV, possibly Amenherkhepshef
Egyptian name
ti i i t Z4 B7
- Dynasty: 20th Dynasty of Egypt
- Father: Sethnakhte?
- Religion: Ancient Egyptian religion

Tyti was an ancient Egyptian queen of the 20th Dynasty. A wife and sister of Ramesses III, she was possibly the mother of Ramesses IV.

== Place of Tyti in the 20th Dynasty ==
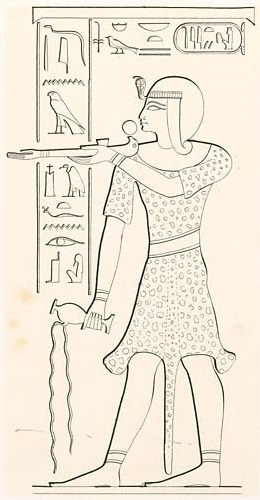
Tyti dressed as an Iunmutef priest (drawing by Lepsius)

It was once uncertain which pharaoh was her husband, but he can now be identified as Ramesses III based on new evidence published in the 2010 issue of the Journal of Egyptian Archaeology (JEA). Her titles show that she was the daughter, sister, wife, and mother of kings.

In the past, some thought she was married to Ramesses X, and that both she and her husband were the children of Ramesses IX, and their son was Ramesses XI but another theory by Jehon Grist placed her earlier in the 20th dynasty and identifies her as a daughter-wife of Ramesses III and the mother of Ramesses IV, based on similarities in style between her tomb and those of princes who lived during this period. However, judging from the age of their child this would mean that Ramesses married his daughter before he ascended the throne, and father-daughter marriages occurred only between pharaohs and their daughters.

Tyti is depicted with a type of crown that is, according to one theory, an attribute of princess-queens (19th-dynasty princess-queen Nebettawy was shown with this crown, and 18th-dynasty Sitamun wore an earlier version of it). The crown consists of a vulture cap topped by a modius decorated by a number of floral crests. However, this overly arbitrary interpretation has now been criticized, because it has been proven that such crowns were worn by women of various categories, including but not limited to queens, princess-queens, princesses, wives or daughters of princes, and royal ladies-in-waiting.

However, new scholarly research printed in the 2010 issue of JEA clearly establishes that Queen Tyti was in fact Ramesses III's wife based on certain copies of parts of the tomb robbery papyri (or Papyrus BM EA 10052)—made by Anthony Harris—which discloses confessions made by Egyptian tomb robbers who broke into Tyti's tomb and emptied it of its jewellery. Tyti is named as a queen of pharaoh Ramesses III which means that she was most likely King Ramesses IV's mother since Ramesses VI is known to be the son of another queen of Ramesses III named Iset Ta-Hemdjert. Even the Egyptologist Aidan Dodson who doubted Grist's theory on the identity of Tyti's royal husband now accepts this new evidence since it comes from newly deciphered notes of this tomb robbery papyrus made by Anthony Harris.

Given her place as the wife of Ramesses III, Leblanc has conjectured that Tyti is the mother of Khaemwaset, Amenherkhepshef and Ramesses-Meryamun. This is based on similarities with regard to their decorative programs. But stylistic similarity can only prove chronological proximity. These princes, especially Khaemwaset, are unlikely to have been sons of Tyti. He, like Pareherwenemef, was an "Eldest King's Son" of the king, which indicates that the king's two eldest sons were born of different mothers, and that he was one of them. If he had been Tyti's eldest son, it is unlikely that he would never have become crown prince and succeeded to the throne, since the next pharaoh was his brother by the same mother, and he lived into that brother's reign. Amenherkhepeshef, however, may well have been a son of Tyti, for in his tomb his titles indicate that he was born of a queen who held numerous titles, and in this period those titles belonged simultaneously only to Tyti.

== Tomb QV52 ==
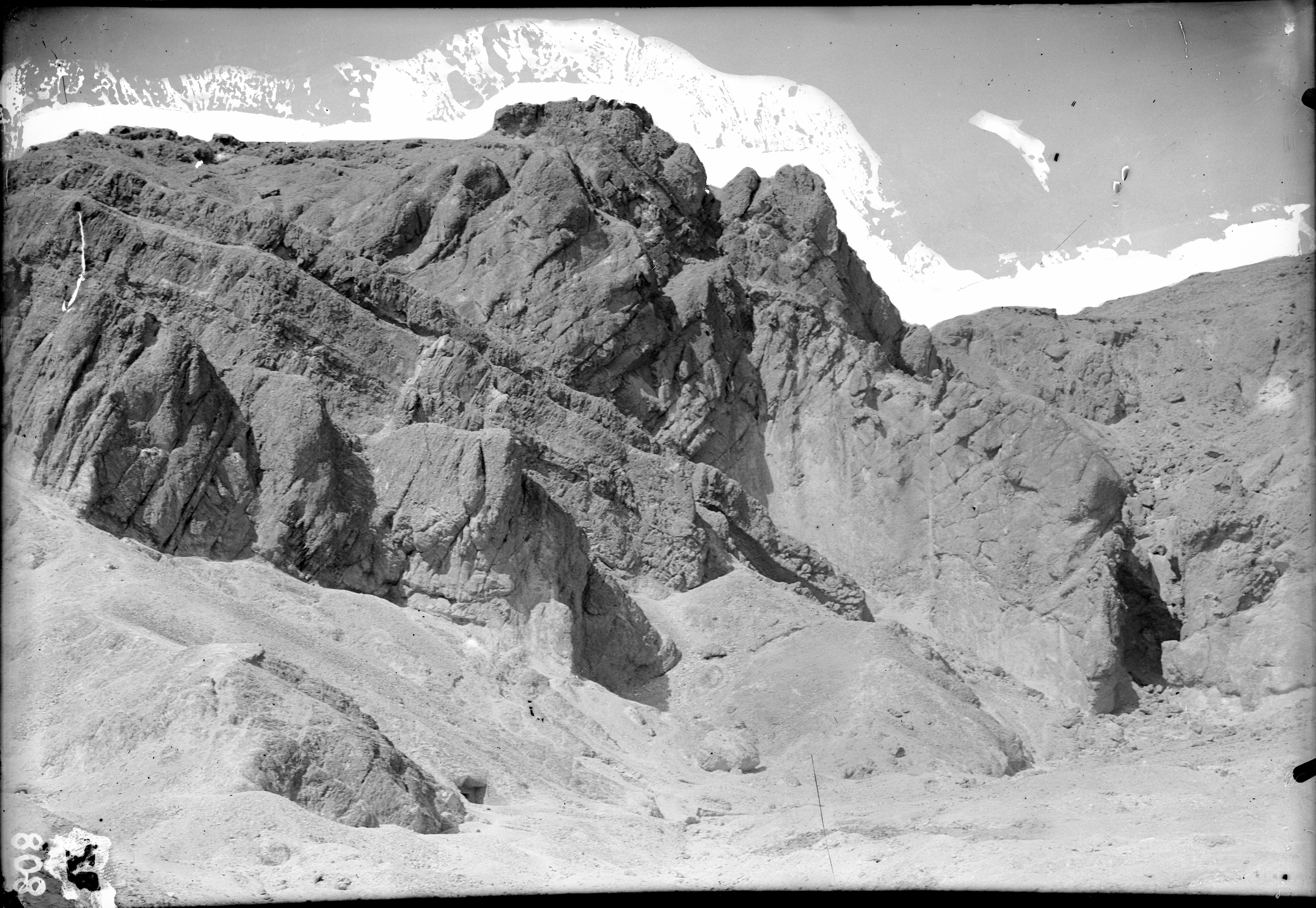
View of the final part of the Valley of the Queens, with the entrance to the tomb QV52, of Queen Tyti, below. Schiaparelli Excavations, 1903–1905

Tyti's tomb is designated QV52 in the Valley of the Queens and her titles were: King's Daughter; King's Sister; King's Wife; King's Mother; God's Wife, Lady of the Two Lands. The tomb had been described by Champollion (tomb 3), Lepsius (number 9), Wilkinson (number 12) and Hay (number 2). The tomb consists of a corridor, side chambers, a hall and an inner (burial) chamber.

The corridor has a doorway that opens up to a further stretch of corridor which has been described as an antechamber. The walls are decorated with deities that form pairs with one on the north wall and the other on the south wall. After a seated winged goddess Ma’at, we find the gods Ptah (South) and Thoth (North) who represent the underworld, then Ra-Harakhti and Atum who are solar deities, followed by Imset and Hapy and by Duamutef and Qebehsenuef, the Four Sons of Horus. The parade of deities is concluded by Isis and Nephthys.

The decorations in the hall consist of protective deities. Included are for instance the gods Herymaat and Nebneru ("Lord of Terror"). Herymaat represents the rebirth of Queen Tyti. The doorways to the side chambers (or annexes) are decorated with guardians that are reminiscent of the Book of the Dead. The entrance to the final chamber is decorated with the Four Sons of Horus. Imset and Duamutef on the south side of the entrance and Hapy and Qebehsenuef on the north side.

The decorations or the side chambers include netherworld gods, images of Canopic chests and the Souls of Pe and Nekhen. One of the side chambers also includes a scene showing the Queen as a (male) Iunmutef priest. In the inner chamber the Queen again appears before several deities. The rear wall contains a scene depicting Osiris. He is seated on a throne and assisted by Thoth, Nephthys, Neith and Serket.

The tomb was reused during the Third Intermediate Period. A pit was dug in the Inner Chambers and excavations have yielded a variety of funerary items, including sarcophagi and personal items.

1903 photos by Ernesto Schiaparelli's Italian archaeological mission, from the Archivio fotografico Museo Egizio, Turin

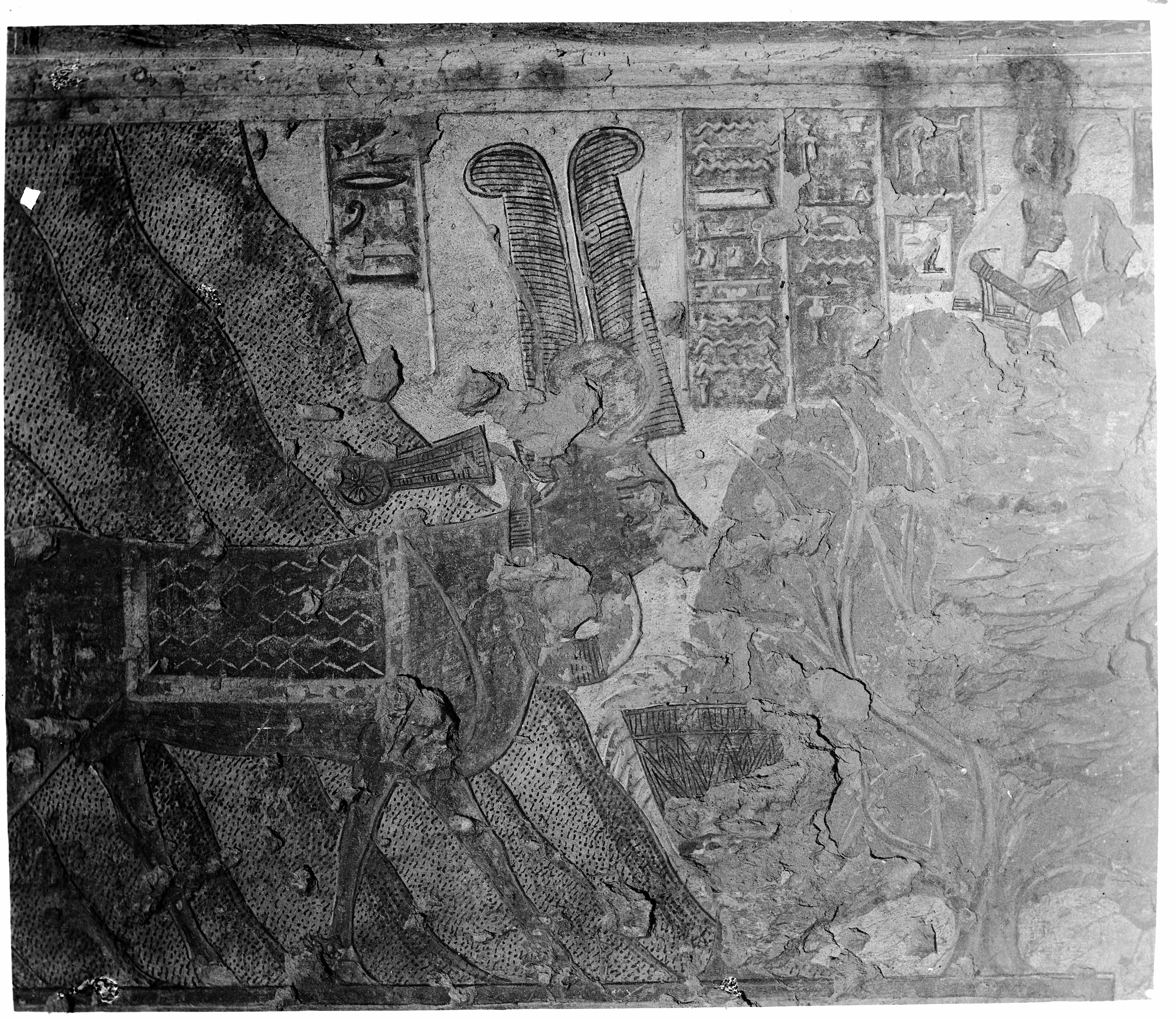
Wall representation from tomb QV52 of Queen Tyti, in the eastern annex, with the goddess Hathor in animal form

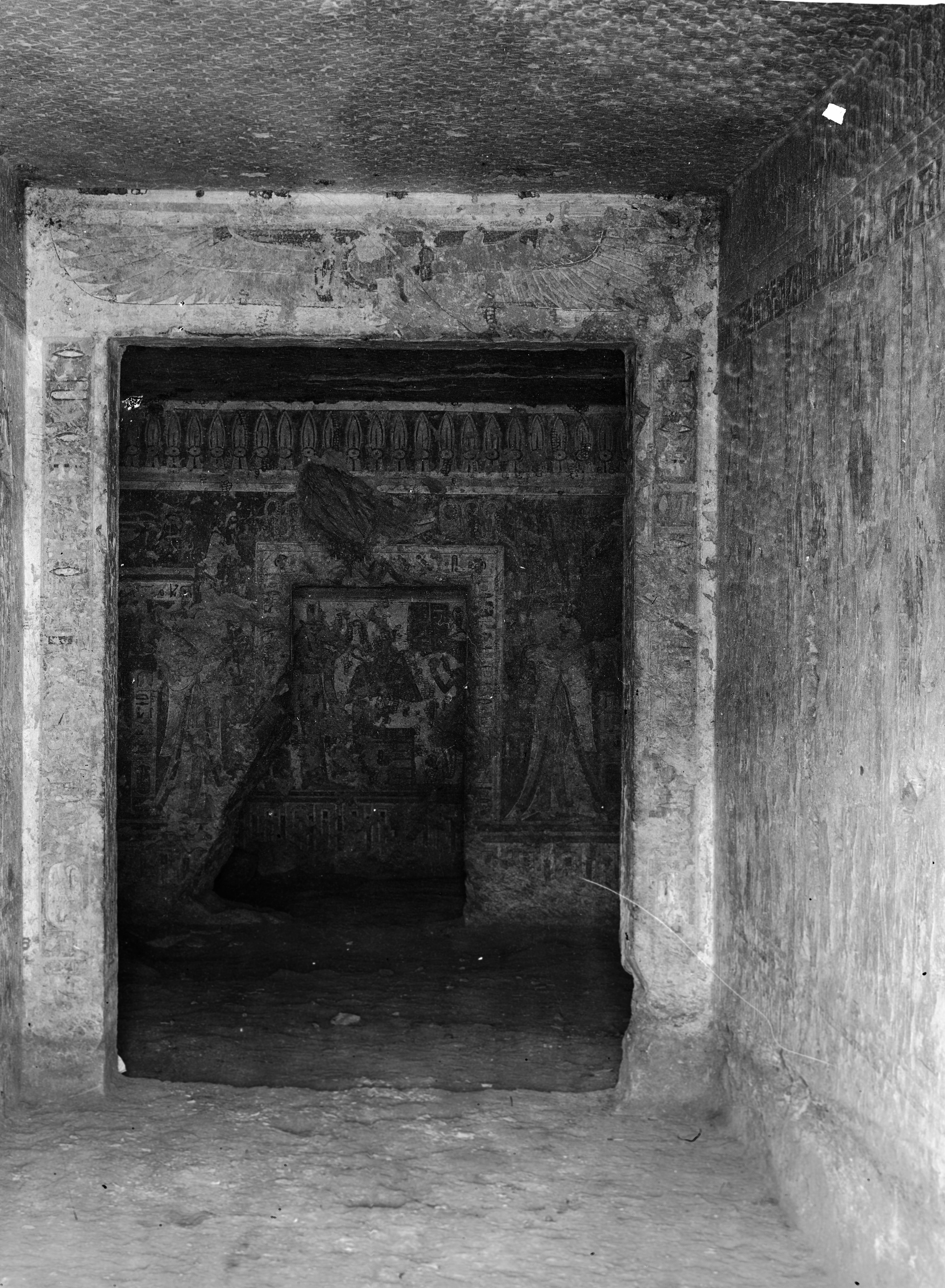
View of the interior of tomb QV52. Photograph taken from the vestibule, in the direction of the burial chamber. In the background, the decoration of the back wall of the rear annex.

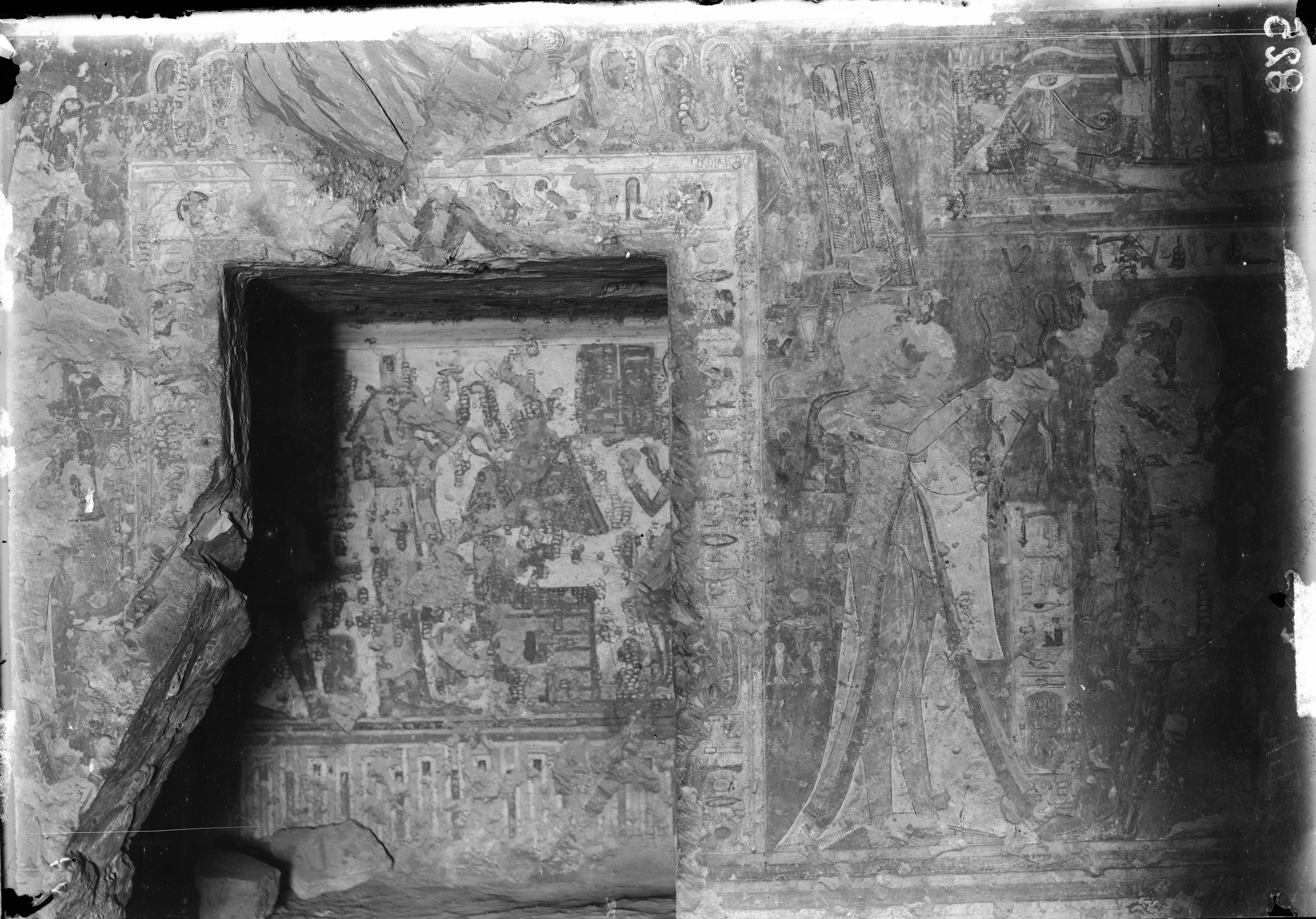
Back wall of the burial chamber of tomb QV 52, from which the rear annex is accessed
