= Iset Ta-Hemdjert =

- Queen consort of Egypt
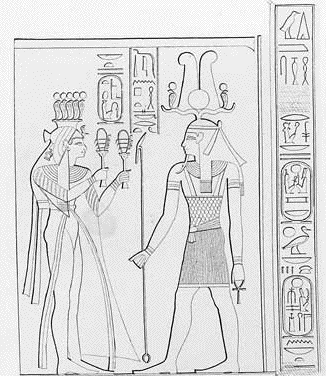
- Queen Isis in the Valley of the Queens
- Burial: QV51
- Spouse: Ramesses III
- Issue: Ramesses VI
- Dynasty: 20th Dynasty of Egypt
- Father: unknown
- Mother: Hemdjert
- Religion: Ancient Egyptian religion

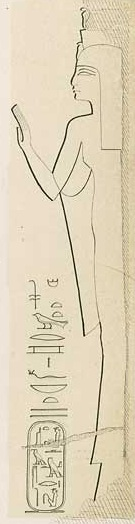
Queen Isis-ta Hemdjert in Karnak

< Q1 t H8 t&A F18 Y1 G20 s r ti B7 >
Iset Ta-Hemdjert
in hieroglyphs
Era: New Kingdom
(1550–1069 BC)

Iset Ta-Hemdjert or Isis Ta-Hemdjert, simply called Isis in her tomb, was an ancient Egyptian queen of the Twentieth Dynasty; the Great Royal Wife of Ramesses III and the Royal Mother of Ramesses VI.

She was probably of Asian origin; her mother's name Hemdjert (or Habadjilat or Hebnerdjent) is not an Egyptian name but a Syrian one. One of her children is known to us, Ramesses VI, who succeeded his nephew Ramesses V, the short-lived son of Ramesses IV. Other than Ramesses V, the grandchildren of Iset Ta-Hemdjert include Ramesses VII, the God's Wife of Amun Iset, and princes Amunherkhopsef and Panebenkemyt; these are all the children of Ramesses VI. Ramesses IV was once thought to be this queen's own son too until it was revealed in a recent 2010 Journal of Egyptian Archaeology article that Queen Tyti was most likely to be this king's mother from copies of fragments of the tomb robbery papyri that Anthony Harris made revealing that she was Ramesses III's own wife plus the fact that she is known to have been a king's mother.

Apart from the Great Royal Wife designation, she also held the titles of God's Wife, and, during the reign of her sons, "King's Mother". She is shown on a statue of Ramesses III in the Mut temple at Karnak.

== Tomb QV51 ==
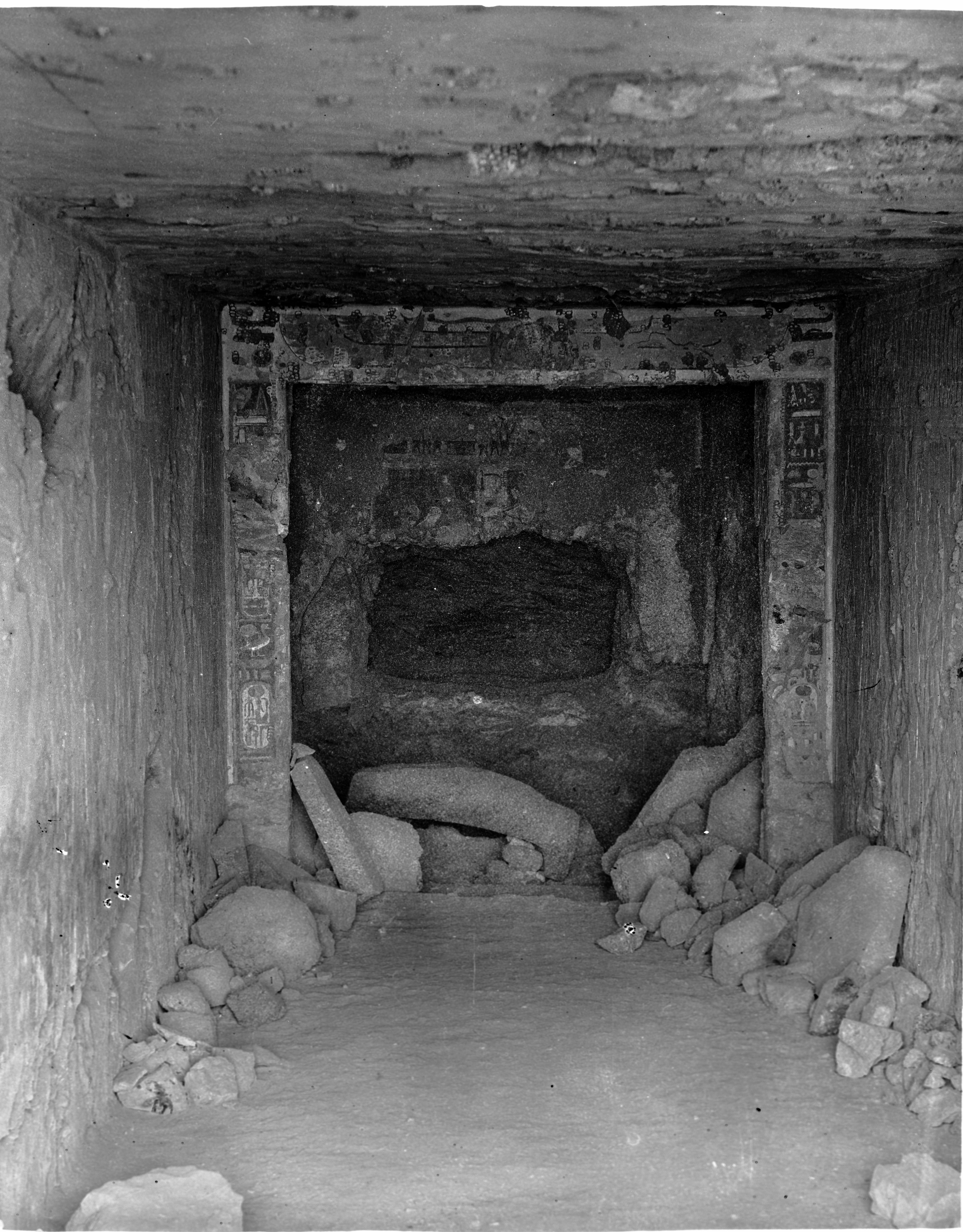
Corridor from the tomb of Queen Isis (QV51). Schiaparelli excavations, 1904. Photographic archive Museo Egizio, Turin.

Isis Ta-Hemdjert was buried in the Valley of the Queens, in tomb QV51. The tomb was described by Champollion, and is documented in Lepsius' Denkmahler. The construction of the tomb may have started during the reign of her husband King Ramesses III, but it was finished during the reign of her son Ramesses VI. The tomb had been looted in ancient times and is mentioned in the papyri regarding the tomb robberies during the 20th Dynasty.

The tomb consists of a corridor ending in a main hall with two side chambers. The corridor is decorated with scenes showing the queen before a variety of divinities including Ptah-Sokar, Atum and Osiris.

The outer jambs for the main hall contain a text by Ramesses VI. The queen appears before several gods, including Ptah. and hawk-god, the god Anhur-Shu and Atum. The side rooms are decorated with scenes showing a variety of goddesses including Neith, Serket, Isis, and Nephthys.

Fragments of a red granite sarcophagus were recovered during the excavations by Schiaparelli and are now in the Museo Egizio in Turin, Italy.

=== Tomb Robbery ===
Papyrus BM 10053 from Year 17 of Ramesses IX records that 8 of the workmen of Deir el-Medina had "been apprehended by the local authorities somewhere within the west Theban necropolis, and [were] duly escorted across the river to the main city of Thebes." The workmen were interrogated for robbing a royal tomb--that of Queen Isis or Iset Ta-Hemdjert here, Ramesses III's chief royal wife. They then disappear from history and were presumably executed by impalement for their crimes.
