= Sahar Saleem =

Egyptian radiologist and professor

- Education: University of Cairo
- Scientific career
- Workplaces: University of Cairo

Sahar Saleem is a professor of radiology at Cairo University where she specialises in paleoradiology, the use of radiology to study mummies. She discovered the knife wound in the throat of Ramesses III, which was most likely the cause of his death.

== Early life and career ==
Sahar Saleem received her degree in medicine from Qasr El Eyni Hospital, Cairo. Subsequently, she went on to receive both her master's and medical doctorate in radiology from Cairo University. She moved to Canada to do a postdoctoral fellowship in neuroradiology and a fellowship in radiology education at the University of Western Ontario, before returning to Cairo University, where she is currently a professor of radiology.

== Research ==
Saleem uses medical imaging, in particular CT scans, to study mummies. This enables her to look through the wrappings, providing more detail than X-rays. She is part of the Egyptian Mummy Project and she has scanned several of the royal mummies, including Hatshepsut, Thutmose III and Seti I, from the Egyptian Museum in Cairo. These mummies have been described in her book Scanning the Pharaohs: CT Imaging of the New Kingdom Royal Mummies, which she co-authored with Zahi Hawass. In 2017, the book was a recipient of the PROSE Award in Popular Science.

By using CT scans on the mummy of Tutankhamun, Saleem and Hawass determined that he was around 19 years old when he was mummified. They also hypothesised that the cause of death was not head trauma, as previously thought, but a knee fracture on a background of malaria.

They also scanned Ramesses III, a pharaoh who was thought to be the victim of a harem conspiracy. Scans performed by Saleem revealed that Ramesses throat was cut and his left toe was cut off, providing supporting evidence that he was likely killed in that conspiracy, as the injuries pointed to there being more than one attacker.

== Selected publications ==
- Hawass, Z., Ismail, S., Selim, A., Saleem, S. N., Fathalla, D., Wasef, S., ... & Gostner, P. (2012). Revisiting the harem conspiracy and death of Ramesses III: anthropological, forensic, radiological, and genetic study. British Medical Journal, 345, e8268.
- Saleem, S. N., Said, A. H. M., & Lee, D. H. (2007). Lesions of the hypothalamus: MR imaging diagnostic features. Radiographics, 27(4), 1087–1108.
- Saleem, S. N. (2014). Fetal MRI: An approach to practice: A review. Journal of advanced research, 5(5), 507–523.

== Book publications ==
Hawass, Z. A., Saleem, S. N., & D’Auria, S. (2018). Scanning the pharaohs: CT imaging of the New Kingdom Royal Mummies. The American University in Cairo Press.
