= Ramesses III =

Pharaoh of Egypt from 1185 to 1154 BC

- Ramses III, Rameses III
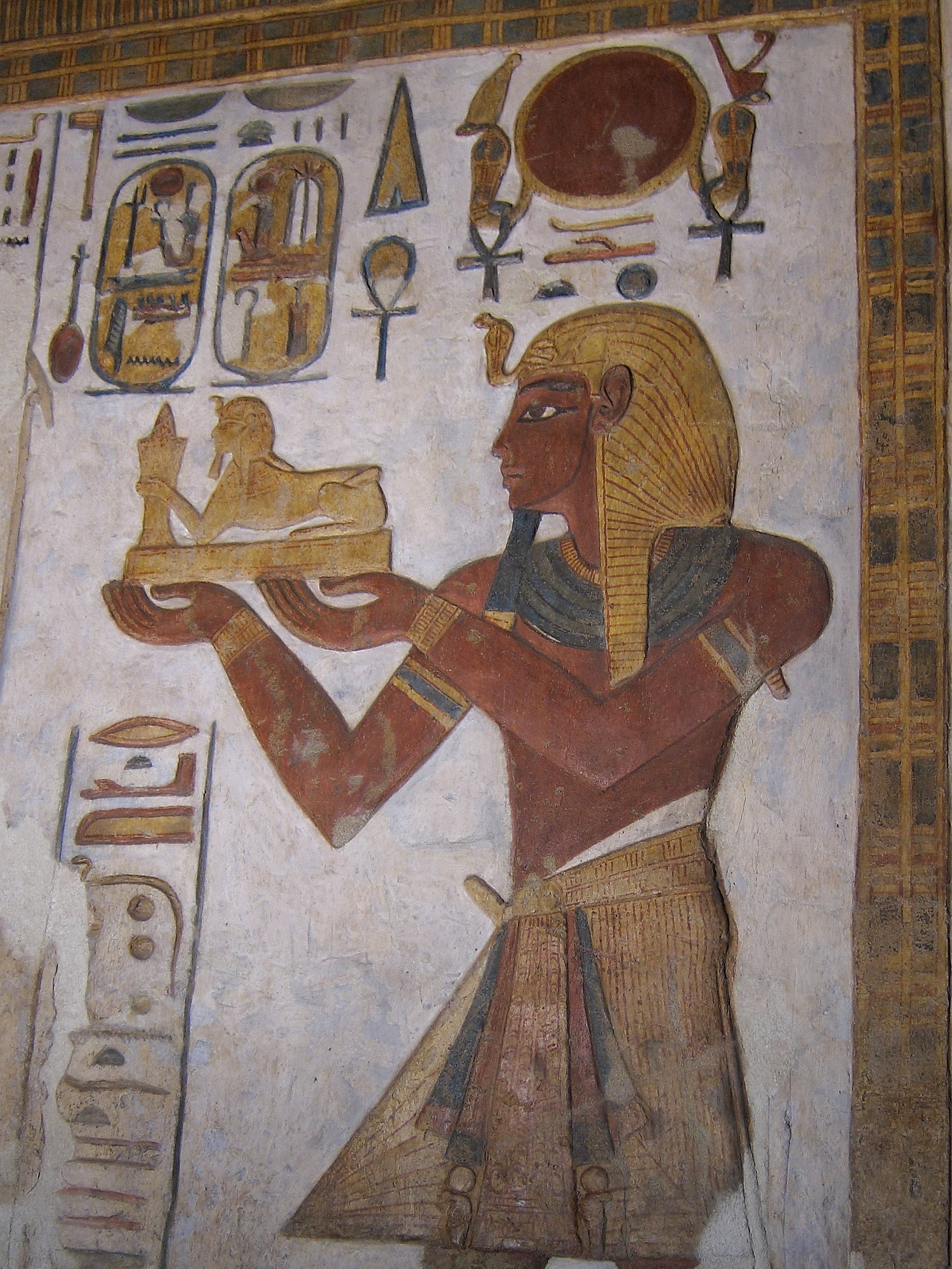
- Relief from the sanctuary of the Temple of Khonsu at Karnak depicting Ramesses III

Pharaoh
- Reign: c. March 1185 – April 1154 BC
- Predecessor: Setnakhte
- Successor: Ramesses IV
Royal titulary
Horus name
Kanakht Aanisut
K3-nḫt-ˁ3-nsyt
Strong bull, whose royalty is great
| G5 | E1 D43 O29 M23 M17 M17 X1 Z2 |
Nebty name
Werhabused mi Tatenen
Wr-ḥˁb.w-sd-mj-T3-ṯnn
Great of Hebsed like Ptah-Tatenen
| G16 | G36 D21 O23 W3 Z3 W19 C18 |
Golden Horus
Userrenput mi Atum
Wsr-rnp.wt-mj-Jtm
The golden falcon, rich in years like Atum
| G8 | F12 M4 M4 M4 W19 A45 |
Prenomen
Usermaatre Meriamun
Wsr-m3ˁt-Rˁ-mrj-Jmn
Strong is the Maat of Ra, beloved of Amun
M23 t L2 t < ra wsr mAat N36 i mn n >
Nomen
Ramesisu Heqaiunu
Rˁ msj sw ḥq3 Jwnw
Ra has fashioned him, ruler of Heliopolis

| G39 N5 | C1 ms z z HqA q iwn |
- Consorts: Tyti, Isis Ta-Hemdjert, Tiye
- Children: By Tyti: Amenherkhepeshef; Ramesses IV; By Isis Ta-Hemdjert: Ramesses VI; By Tiye: Pentawere; By unknown wives: Pareherwenemef; Khaemwaset; Montuherkhopshef; Meryatum; Ramesses VIII; Meryamun; Duatentopet (?)
- Father: Setnakhte
- Mother: Tiy-Merenese
- Born: 1217 BC?
- Died: 1154 BC (aged 61-62)
- Burial: KV11; Mummy found in the Deir el-Bahri royal cache (Theban Necropolis)
- Monuments: Medinet Habu
- Dynasty: 20th Dynasty

Usermaatre Meryamun Ramesses III was the second Pharaoh of the Twentieth Dynasty in ancient Egypt. Some scholars date his reign from March 1185 to April 1154 BC, and he is considered to be the last pharaoh of the New Kingdom to have wielded substantial power.

His long reign saw the decline of Egyptian political and economic power, linked to a series of invasions and internal economic problems that also plagued pharaohs before him. This coincided with a decline in the cultural sphere of Ancient Egypt.

The defensive strategy of Ramesses III was able to slow down Egypt's decline, though it meant that his successors had a weaker military. He has also been described as a "warrior Pharaoh" due to his strong military strategies. At the Battle of the Delta and Battle of Djahy his armies defeated the invaders known as "the Sea Peoples", who had caused destruction in other civilizations and empires. He was able to save Egypt from collapsing at the time when many other empires fell during the Late Bronze Age; however, the damage of the invasions took a toll on Egypt.

Rameses III constructed one of the largest mortuary temples of western Thebes, now called Medinet Habu. He was assassinated in the Harem conspiracy led by his secondary wife Tiye and her eldest son Pentawere. This ultimately caused a succession crisis which further accelerated the decline of Ancient Egypt. He was succeeded by his son and designated successor Ramesses IV, although many of his other sons would rule later.

== Name ==
Ramesses' (also written Ramses and Rameses) two main names are transliterated wsr-mꜢʿt-rʿ–mry-ỉmn rʿ-ms-s–ḥḳꜢ-ỉwnw. They are normally realised as Usermaatre-Meryamun Rameses-Heqaiunu, meaning "The Ma'at of Ra is strong, Beloved of Amun, Born of Ra, Ruler of Heliopolis".

== Early years ==
Ramesses III was not closely related to Ramesses I or Ramesses II. He was the son of Setnakhte and Tiy-Merenese who wrote her name in a cartouche. Setnakhte's origin is unknown. He seized the throne during a time of crisis and political unrest likely from Twosret and he was presumably a minor descendant of Ramesses II through a separate family line from that of Seti II, Siptah and Twosret.

== Accession ==
Ramesses III is believed to have reigned from March 1185 to April 1154 BC. This is based on his known accession date of I Shemu day 26 and his death on Year 32 III Shemu day 15. Some scholars estimate a reign of 31 years, 1 month and 19 days. Alternative dates for his reign are 1187–1156 BC.

In a description of his coronation from Medinet Habu, four doves were said to be "dispatched to the four corners of the horizon to confirm that the living Horus, Ramses III, is (still) in possession of his throne, that the order of Maat prevails in the cosmos and society".

== Tenure of constant war ==
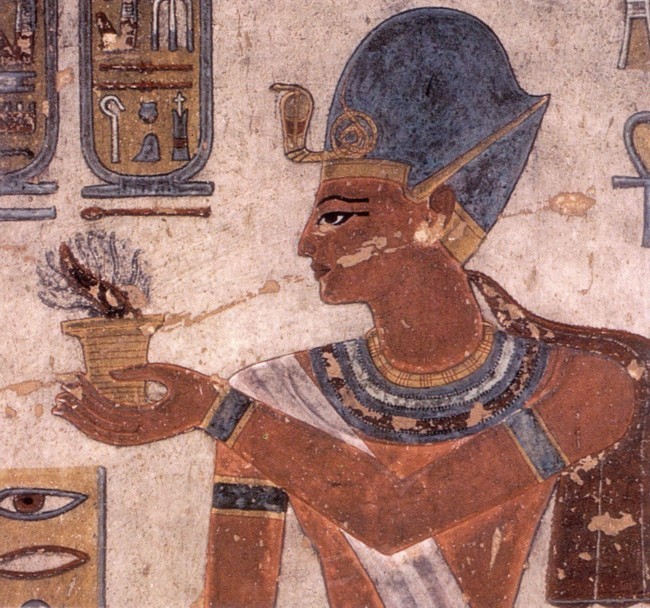
Ramses III offering incense, wall painting in KV11.

During his long tenure in the midst of the surrounding political chaos of the Late Bronze Age collapse, Egypt was beset by foreign invaders (including the so-called Sea Peoples and the Libyans) and experienced the beginnings of increasing economic difficulties and internal strife which eventually led to the collapse of the Twentieth Dynasty.

In Year 8 of his reign, the Sea Peoples, including Peleset, Denyen, Shardana, Meshwesh of the sea, and Tjekker, invaded Egypt by land and sea. Ramesses III defeated them in two great land and sea battles. First, he defeated them on land in the Battle of Djahy on the Egyptian Empire's easternmost frontier in Djahy or modern-day southern Lebanon. The second one was the Battle of the Delta, in which Ramesses enticed the Sea Peoples and their ships into the mouth of the Nile, where he had assembled a fleet in ambush. Although the Egyptians had a reputation as poor seamen, they fought tenaciously. Ramesses lined the shores with ranks of archers who kept up a continuous volley of arrows into the enemy ships when they attempted to land on the banks of the Nile. Then, the Egyptian navy attacked using grappling hooks to haul in the enemy ships. In the brutal hand-to-hand fighting which ensued, the Sea Peoples were utterly defeated. The Harris Papyrus states:

As for those who reached my frontier, their seed is not, their heart and their soul are finished forever and ever. As for those who came forward together on the seas, the full flame was in front of them at the Nile mouths, while a stockade of lances surrounded them on the shore, prostrated on the beach, slain, and made into heaps from head to tail.

Ramesses III incorporated the Sea Peoples as subject peoples and settled them in southern Canaan. Their presence in Canaan may have contributed to the formation of new states in this region such as Philistia after the collapse of the Egyptian Empire in Asia. During the reign of Ramses III, Egyptian presence in the Levant is still attested as far as Byblos and he may have campaigned further north into Syria. Further south, inscriptions of Ramses III have been found in southern Jordan and northern Saudi Arabia which were inscribed as the pharaoh led an army through the area according to archaeologists. He was also compelled to fight invading Libyan tribesmen in two major campaigns in Egypt's Western Delta in his Year 5 and Year 11 respectively. By the early 12th century, Egypt claimed overlordship of Cyrenaican tribes. At one point a ruler chosen by Egypt was set up (briefly) over the combined tribes of Meshwesh, Libu, and Soped.

In April 2025, the Jordanian Ministry of Tourism announced the discovery of a hieroglyphic inscription bearing the royal cartouche of Ramesses III in the Wadi Rum Reserve in southern Jordan. The Jordanian scientific team emphasized that this discovery provides tangible evidence of a military or commercial campaign, proving Ramesses III's influence in the southern Levant and the Arabian Peninsula.

== Economic turmoil ==
The heavy cost of these battles slowly exhausted Egypt's treasury and contributed to the gradual decline of the Egyptian Empire in Asia. The severity of these difficulties is stressed by the fact that the first known labour strike in recorded history occurred during Year 29 of Ramesses III's reign, when the food rations for the favoured and elite royal tomb-builders and artisans in the village of Set Maat her imenty Waset (now known as Deir el-Medina), could not be provisioned. Something in the air (possibly the Hekla 3 eruption) prevented much sunlight from reaching the ground and also arrested global tree growth for almost two full decades until 1140 BC. The result in Egypt was a substantial increase in grain prices under the later reigns of Ramesses VI-VII, whereas the prices for fowl and slaves remained constant. Thus the cooldown affected Ramesses III's final years and impaired his ability to provide a constant supply of grain rations to the workmen of the Deir el-Medina community.

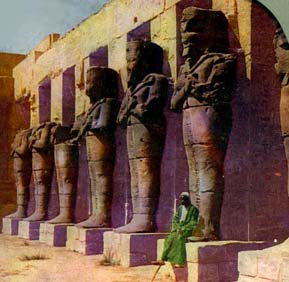
Osirid statues of Ramses III at his temple in Karnak (in the first courtyard of the Great Temple of Amun)

These difficult realities are completely ignored in Ramesses' official monuments, many of which seek to emulate those of his famous predecessor, Ramesses II, and which present an image of continuity and stability. He built important additions to the temples at Luxor and Karnak, and his funerary temple and administrative complex at Medinet Habu is amongst the largest and best-preserved in Egypt; however, the uncertainty of Ramesses' times is apparent from the massive fortifications which were built to enclose the latter. No temple in the heart of Egypt prior to Ramesses' reign had ever needed to be protected in such a manner.

== Assassination ==
Fragment of the "Journal of the Necropolis" concerning the change of reign Ramesses III to Ramesses IV. Museo Egizio, Turin.

Thanks to the discovery of papyrus trial transcripts (dated to Ramesses III), it is now known that there was a plot against his life as a result of a royal harem conspiracy during a celebration at Medinet Habu on day 15 of month 2 of Shemu 1155 BC. The conspiracy was instigated by Tiye, one of his three known wives (the others being Tyti and Iset Ta-Hemdjert), over whose son would inherit the throne. Ramesses III failed to clearly establish the order of succession among his sons. He also did not respect their birth order, and the heir he designated, Ramesses IV, was likely younger than another of his sons, Khaemwaset. This miscalculation may have led his second wife, Queen Tiye, to believe that her own younger son could also bypass his elder brothers and become pharaoh, thereby enabling her to plot a conspiracy to murder the king within the royal harem.

The trial documents show that many individuals were implicated in the plot. Chief among them were Queen Tiye and her son Pentaweret, Ramesses' chief of the chamber, Pebekkamen, seven royal butlers (a respectable state office), two Treasury overseers, two Army standard bearers, two royal scribes and a herald. There is little doubt that all of the main conspirators were executed: some of the condemned were given the option of committing suicide (possibly by poison) rather than being put to death. According to the surviving trial transcripts, a total of three separate trials were started, while 38 people were sentenced to death. The tombs of Tiye and her son Pentaweret were robbed and their names erased to prevent them from enjoying an afterlife. The Egyptians did such a thorough job of this that the only references to them are the trial documents and what remains of their tombs.

Some of the accused harem women tried to seduce the members of the judiciary who tried them but were caught in the act. Judges who were involved were severely punished.

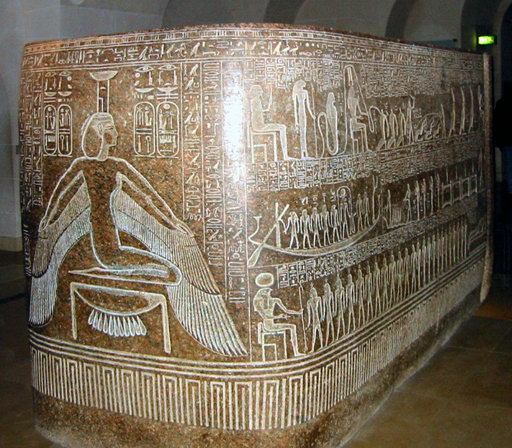
Red granite sarcophagus of Ramesses III (Louvre). The Lid is in the Fitzwilliam Museum.

Ramesses IV, the king's designated successor, assumed the throne upon his death rather than Pentaweret, who was intended to be the main beneficiary of the palace conspiracy. Moreover, Ramesses III died in his 32nd year before the summaries of the sentences were composed, but the same year that the trial documents record the trial and execution of the conspirators.

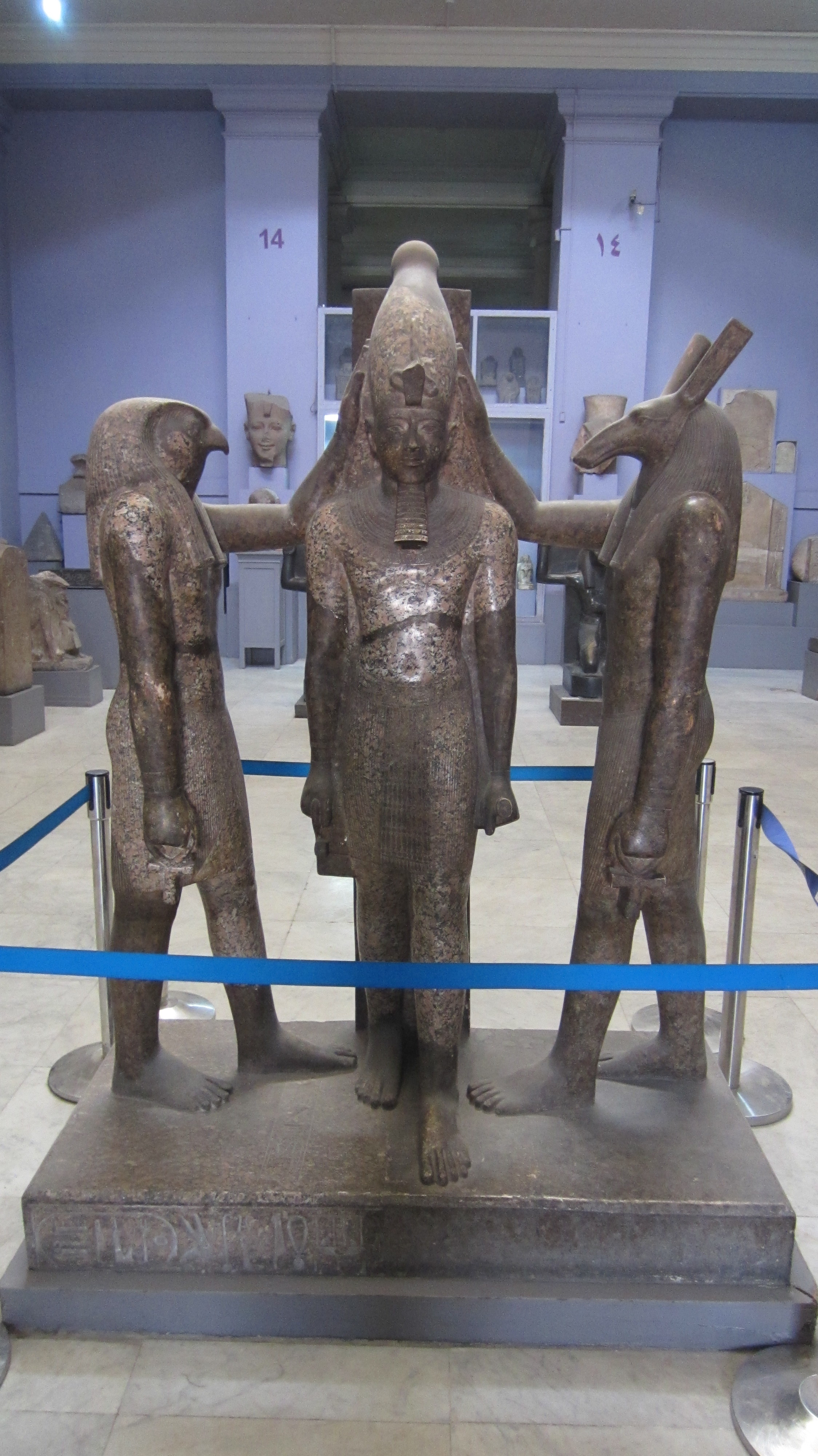
The gods Horus (left) and Set (right) blessing Ramesses III in this statue, currently located in the Egyptian Museum.

Although it was long believed that Ramesses III's body showed no obvious wounds, an examination of the mummy by a German forensic team, televised in the documentary Ramesses: Mummy King Mystery on the Science Channel in 2011, showed excessive bandages around the neck. A subsequent CT scan that was done in Egypt by Ashraf Selim and Sahar Saleem, professors of radiology at Cairo University, revealed that beneath the bandages was a deep knife wound across the throat, deep enough to reach the vertebrae. According to the documentary narrator, "It was a wound no one could have survived." The CT scan revealed that his throat was cut to the bone, severing the trachea, oesophagus, and blood vessels, which would have been rapidly fatal. The December 2012 issue of the British Medical Journal quoted the conclusion of the study of the team of researchers, led by Zahi Hawass, the former head of the Egyptian Supreme Council of Antiquity, and his Egyptian team, as well as Albert Zink from the Institute for Mummies and the Iceman of Eurac Research in Bolzano, Italy, which stated that conspirators murdered Ramesses III by cutting his throat. Zink observed in an interview that:

I have almost no doubt about the fact that Ramses III was killed by this cut in his throat....The cut [to Ramesses III's throat] is ... very deep and quite large, it really goes down almost down to the bone (spine) – it must have been a lethal injury.

A subsequent study of the CT scan of the mummy of Ramesses III's body by Sahar Saleem revealed that the left big toe was likely chopped by a heavy sharp object like an ax. There were no signs of bone healing so this injury must have happened shortly before death. The embalmers placed a prosthesis-like object made of linen in place of the amputated toe. The embalmers placed six amulets around both feet and ankles for magical healing of the wound for the life after. This additional injury of the foot supports the assassination of the Pharaoh, likely by the hands of multiple assailants using different weapons.

Before this discovery it had been speculated that Ramesses III had been killed by means that would not have left a mark on the body. Among the conspirators were practitioners of magic, who might well have used poison. Some had put forth a hypothesis that a snakebite from a viper was the cause of the king's death. His mummy includes an amulet to protect Ramesses III in the afterlife from snakes. The servant in charge of his food and drink were also among the listed conspirators, but there were also other conspirators who were called the snake and the lord of snakes.

In one respect the conspirators certainly failed. The crown passed to the king's designated successor: Ramesses IV. Ramesses III may have been doubtful as to the latter's chances of succeeding him, given that, in the Great Harris Papyrus, he implored Amun to ensure his son's rights.

== DNA and possible relationship with his son Pentawere ==
A multidisciplinary study led by Albert Zink examined the mummies of Ramesses III and an unidentified young man (known as “Unknown Man E”) found together in the Deir el-Bahari cache. Genetic analysis demonstrated that the two individuals shared identical Y-chromosomal short tandem repeat (STR) haplotypes and autosomal STR profiles consistent with a first-degree paternal relationship. Combined with the unusual mummification procedure of Unknown Man E, which has been interpreted as indicative of punishment, the authors concluded that he is a strong candidate for Pentawere, the son of Ramesses III implicated in the harem conspiracy. The precise cause of death of Unknown Man E could not be determined.

The study used Y-STR data to assess paternal lineage; however, no Y-chromosomal single-nucleotide polymorphism (SNP) testing was performed. A Y-chromosomal haplogroup was inferred using a probabilistic STR-based predictor, but this result represents a prediction rather than a directly determined haplogroup.

Earlier genetic work by Hawass and colleagues, conducted as part of the King Tutankhamun Family Project, employed anthropological, radiological, and genetic methods to investigate familial relationships among New Kingdom royal mummies and to examine evidence for disease and inherited conditions. In 2012, similar methods were applied specifically to the mummies of Ramesses III and Unknown Man E.

In 2022, S. O. Y. Keita discussed previously published STR data from these studies in the context of a broader critique of racial and typological frameworks used in Nile Valley scholarship. He noted that when genetic data are analysed using highly constrained comparative models, such as those limited to broad categories labelled “Eurasian,” “sub-Saharan African,” and “East Asian”, some outcomes may show statistical proximity to one or another reference group. Keita emphasized, however, that such results are contingent on the choice of reference populations and analytical assumptions, reflect modern classificatory constructs rather than discrete biological populations, and cannot be used to infer exclusive or definitive ancestry. He argued that Nile Valley populations are better understood within an evolutionary and regional framework characterized by long-term local continuity, variation, and interaction, rather than modern racial categories.

== Legacy ==
The Great Harris Papyrus or Papyrus Harris I, which was commissioned by his son and chosen successor Ramesses IV, chronicles this king's vast donations of land, gold statues and monumental construction to Egypt's various temples at Piramesse, Heliopolis, Memphis, Athribis, Hermopolis, This, Abydos, Coptos, El Kab and various cities in Nubia. It also records that the king dispatched a trading expedition to the Land of Punt and quarried the copper mines of Timna in southern Canaan. Papyrus Harris I records some of Ramesses III's activities:

I sent my emissaries to the land of Atika, [i.e., Timna] to the great copper mines which are there. Their ships carried them along and others went overland on their donkeys. It had not been heard of since the [time of any earlier] king. Their mines were found and [they] yielded copper which was loaded by tens of thousands into their ships, they being sent in their care to Egypt, and arriving safely. (P. Harris I, 78, 1–4)

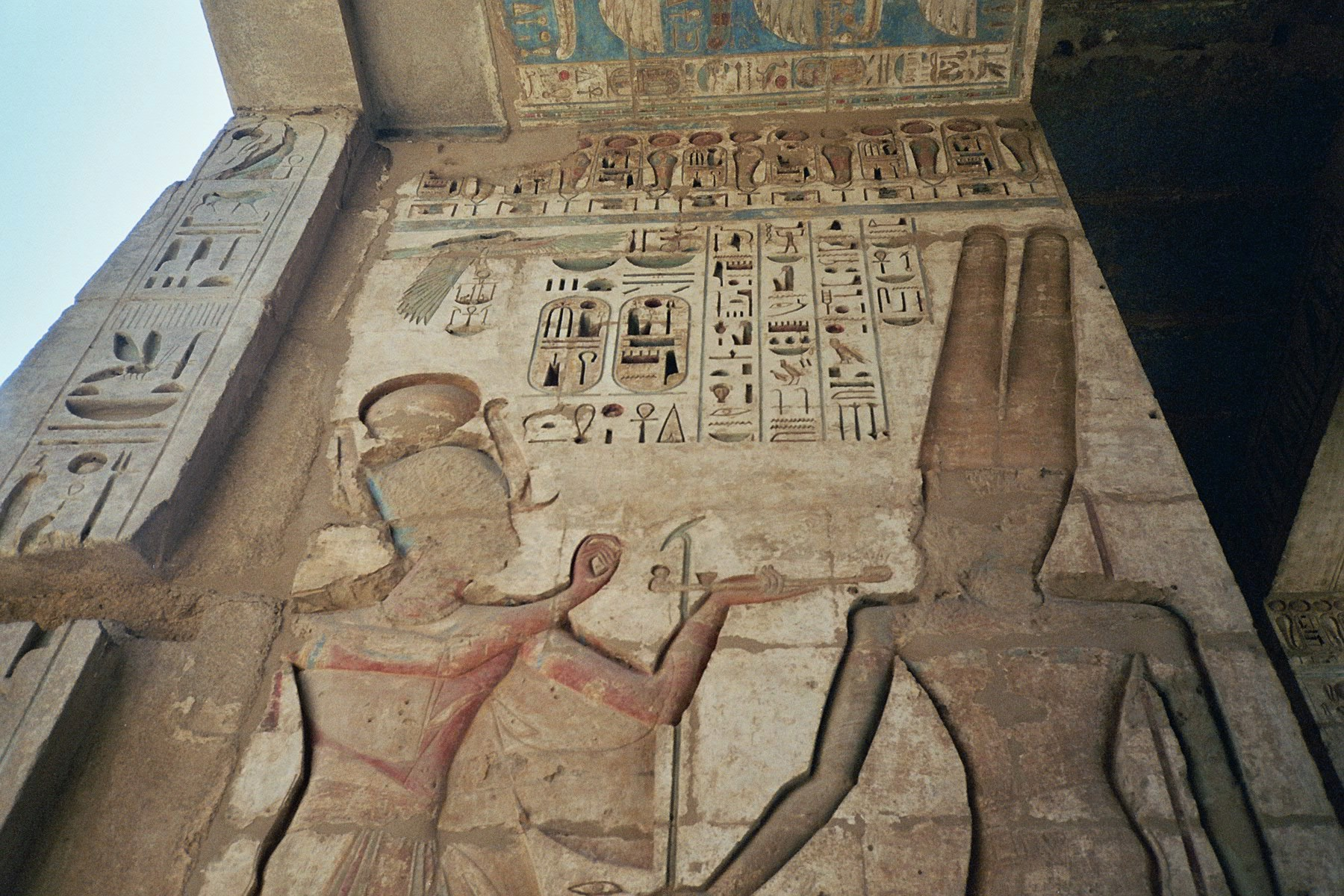
Medinet Habu temple relief of Ramesses III

Ramesses began the reconstruction of the Temple of Khonsu at Karnak from the foundations of an earlier temple of Amenhotep III and completed the Temple of Medinet Habu around his Year 12. He decorated the walls of his Medinet Habu temple with scenes of his naval and land battles against the Sea Peoples. This monument stands today as one of the best-preserved temples of the New Kingdom.

The mummy of Ramesses III was discovered by antiquarians in 1886 and is regarded as the prototypical Egyptian Mummy in numerous Hollywood movies. His tomb (KV11) is one of the largest in the Valley of the Kings.

In 1980, James Harris and Edward F. Wente conducted a series of X-ray examinations on New Kingdom Pharaohs crania and skeletal remains, which included the mummified remains of Ramesses III. The analysis in general found strong similarities between the New Kingdom rulers of the 19th Dynasty and 20th Dynasty with Mesolithic Nubian samples. The authors also noted affinities with modern Mediterranean populations of Levantine origin. Harris and Wente suggested this represented admixture as the Rammessides were of northern origin.

In April 2021, his mummy was moved from the Museum of Egyptian Antiquities to the National Museum of Egyptian Civilization along with those of 17 other kings and 4 queens in an event termed the Pharaohs' Golden Parade.

== Chronological dispute ==
There is uncertainty regarding the exact dates of the reign of Ramesses III. This uncertainty affects the dating of the Late Bronze/Iron Age transition in the Levant. This transition is defined by the appearance of Mycenaean LH IIIC:1b (Philistine) pottery in the coastal plain of Palestine, generally assumed to correspond to the settlement of Sea Peoples there at the 8th year of Ramesses III. Radiocarbon dates and other external evidence permit this transition to be as late as 1100 BC, compared to the conventional dating of c. 1179 BC.

Some scientists have tried to establish a chronological point for this pharaoh's reign at 1159 BC, based on a 1999 dating of the Hekla 3 eruption of the Hekla volcano in Iceland. Since contemporary records show that the king experienced difficulties provisioning his workmen at Deir el-Medina with supplies in his 29th Year, this dating of Hekla 3 might connect his 28th or 29th regnal year to c. 1159 BC. A minor discrepancy of one year is possible since Egypt's granaries could have had reserves to cope with at least a single bad year of crop harvests following the onset of the disaster. This implies that the king's reign would have ended just three to four years later, around 1156 or 1155 BC. A rival date of "2900 BP" (950 BC) has since been proposed by scientists based on a re-examination of the volcanic layer. Given that no Egyptologist dates Ramesses III's reign to as late as 1000 BC, this would mean that the Hekla 3 eruption presumably occurred well after Ramesses III's reign. A 2002 study, using high-precision radiocarbon dating of a peat deposit containing ash layers, put this eruption in the range 1087–1006 BC.

== Gallery ==
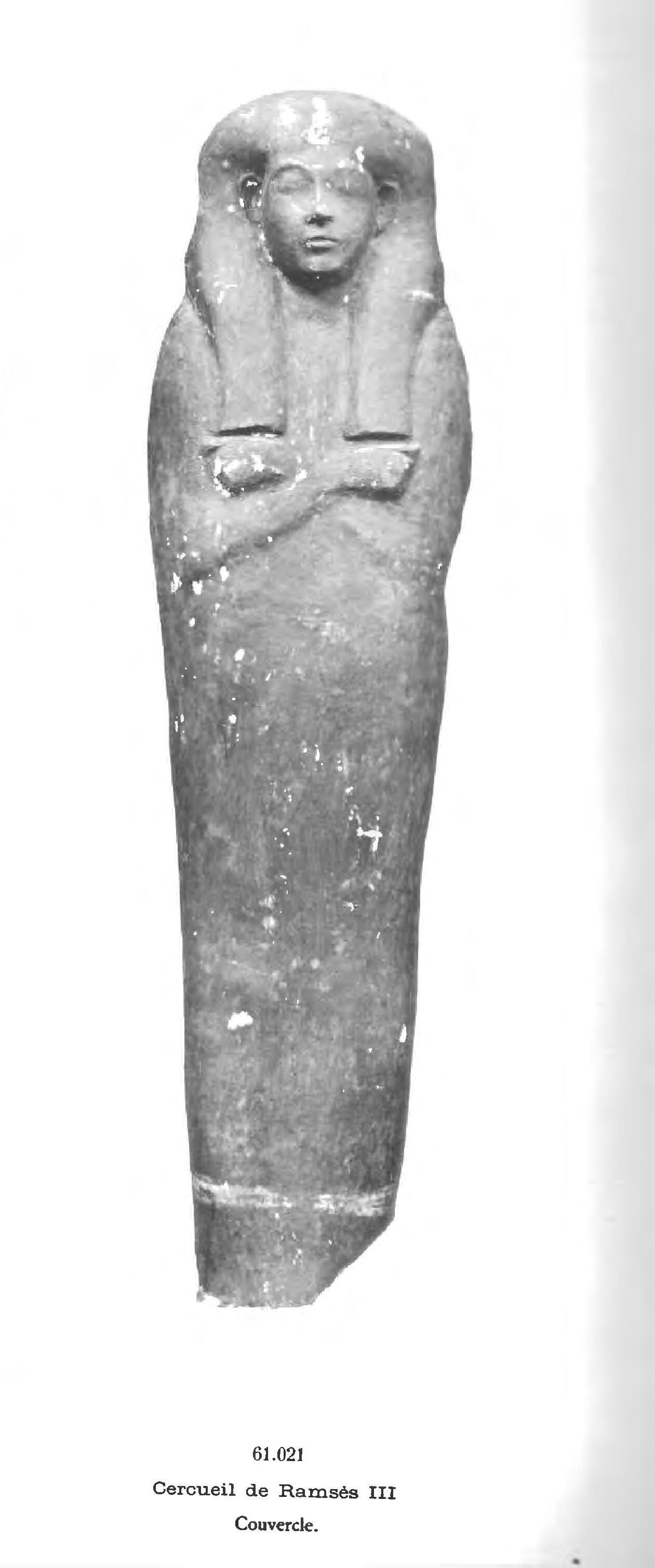
Coffin of Ramesses III

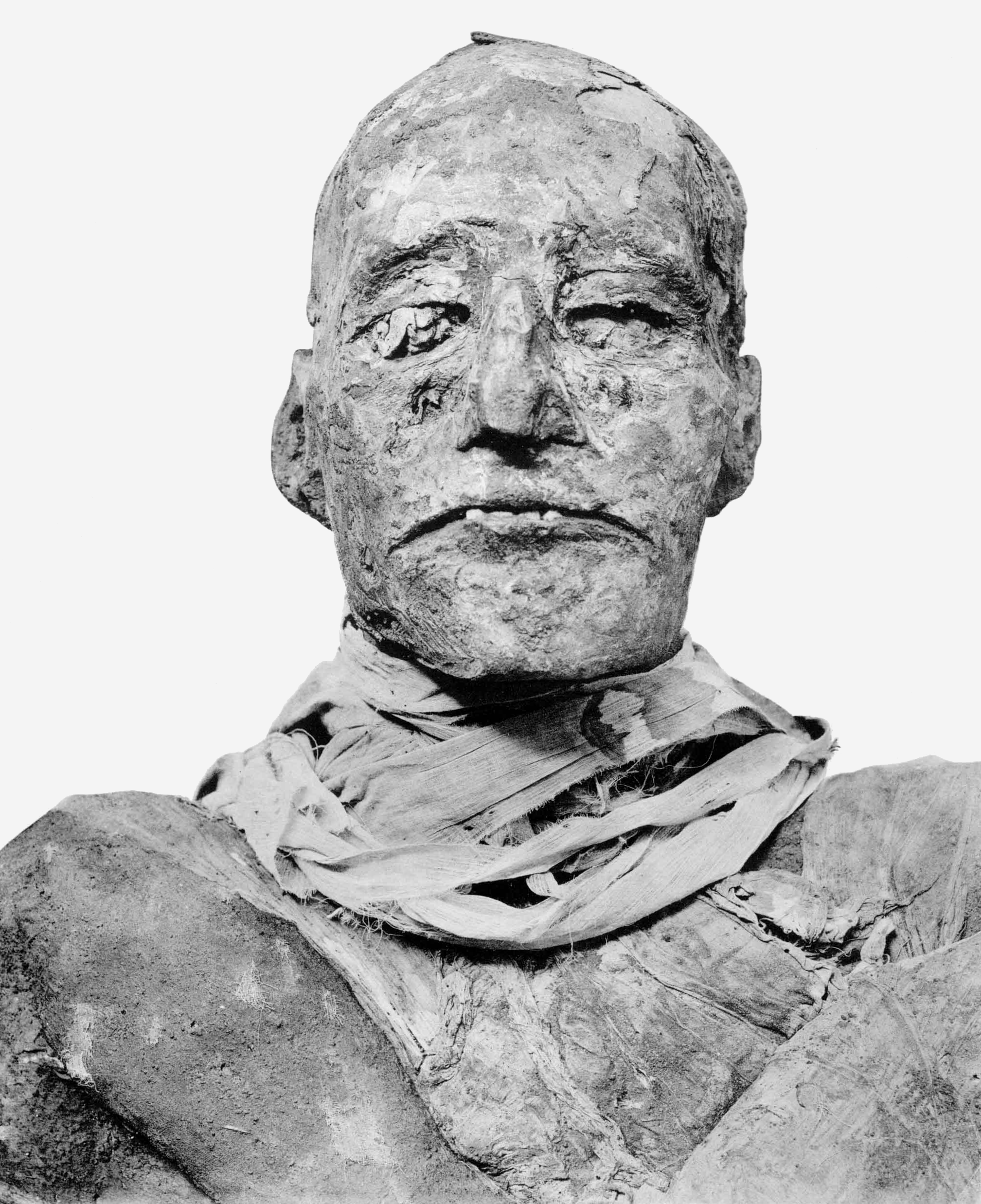
Ramesses III's mummy

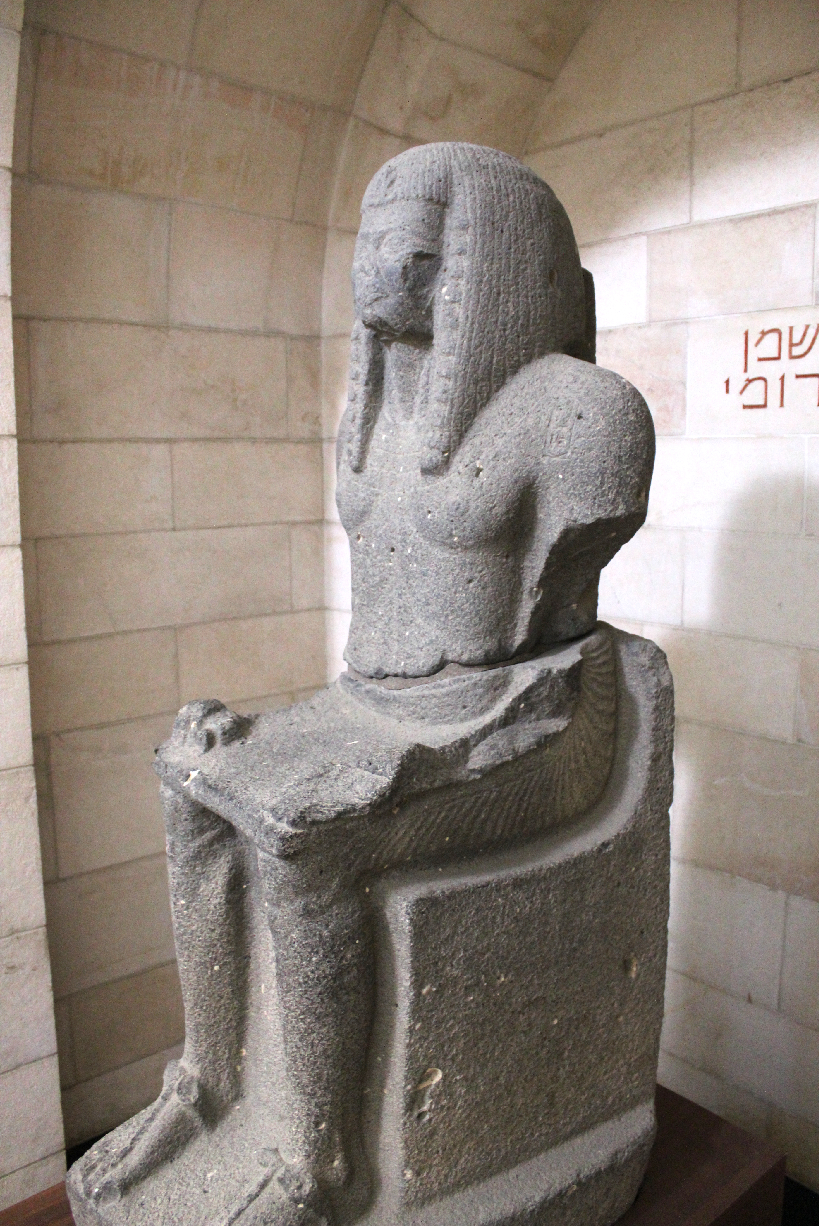
Statue of Ramesses III at the Rockefeller Museum, Jerusalem

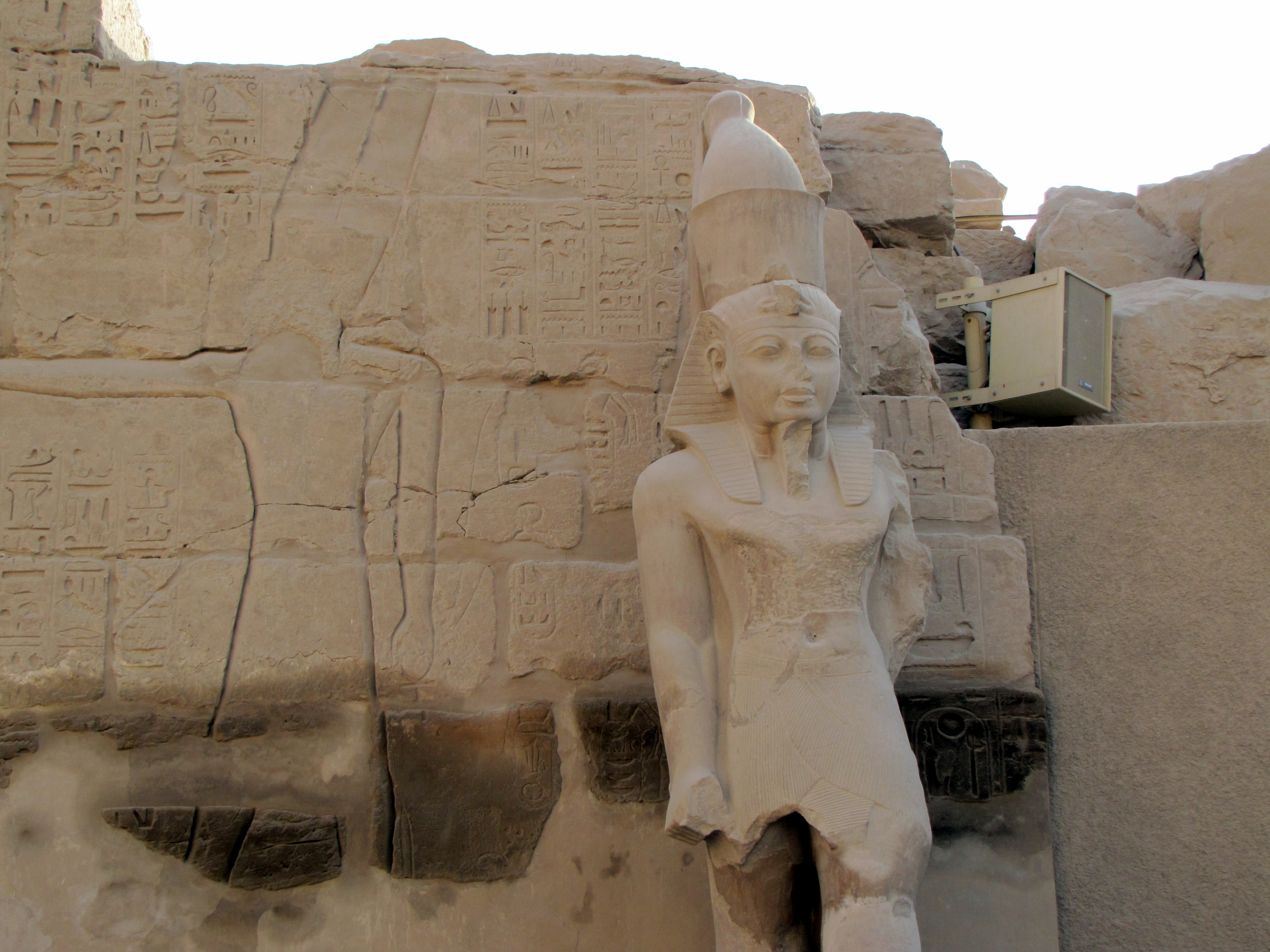
Statue of Ramesses III at the Amun-Re temple in Karnak

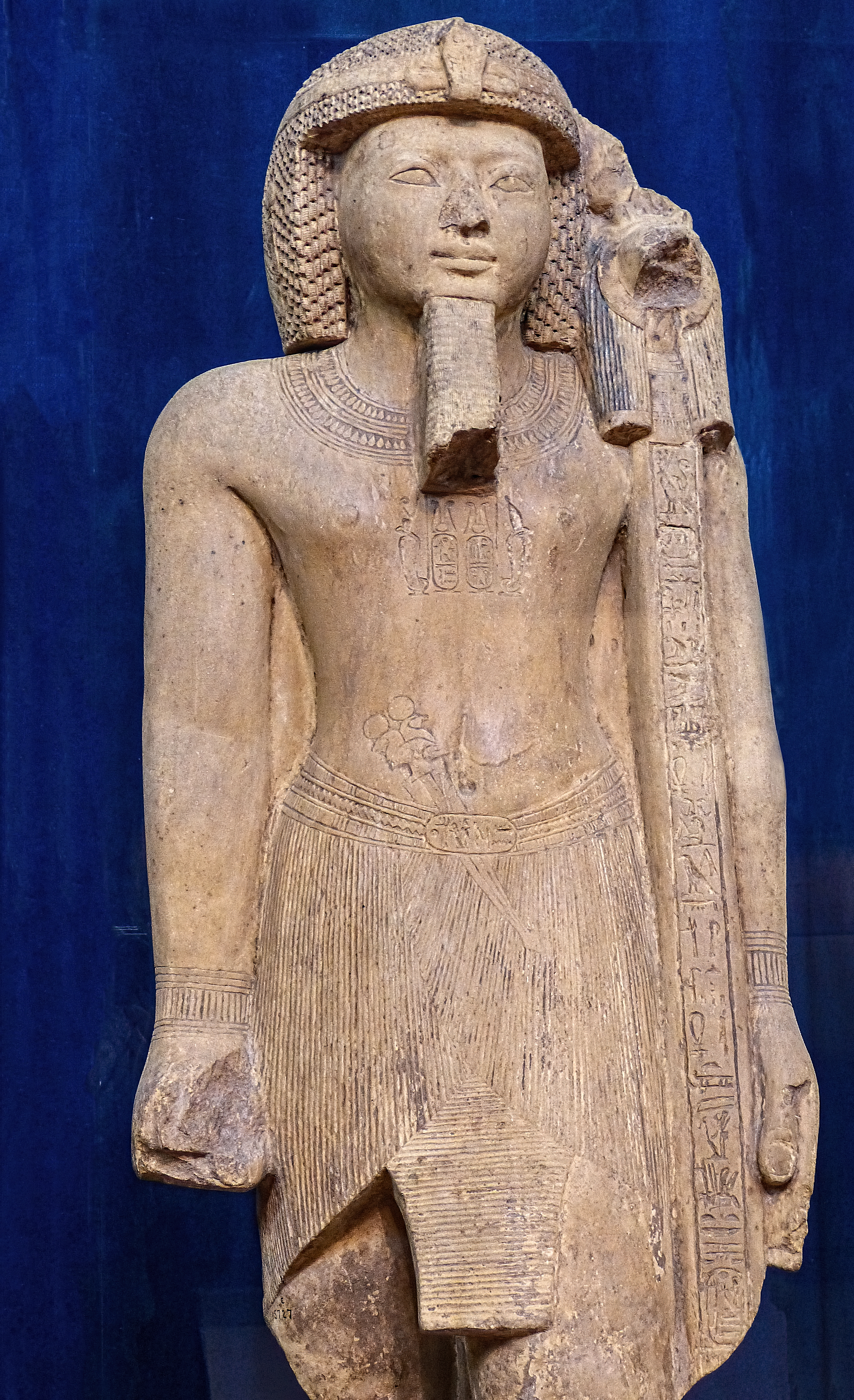
Statue of Ramesses III at the Penn Museum, Philadelphia

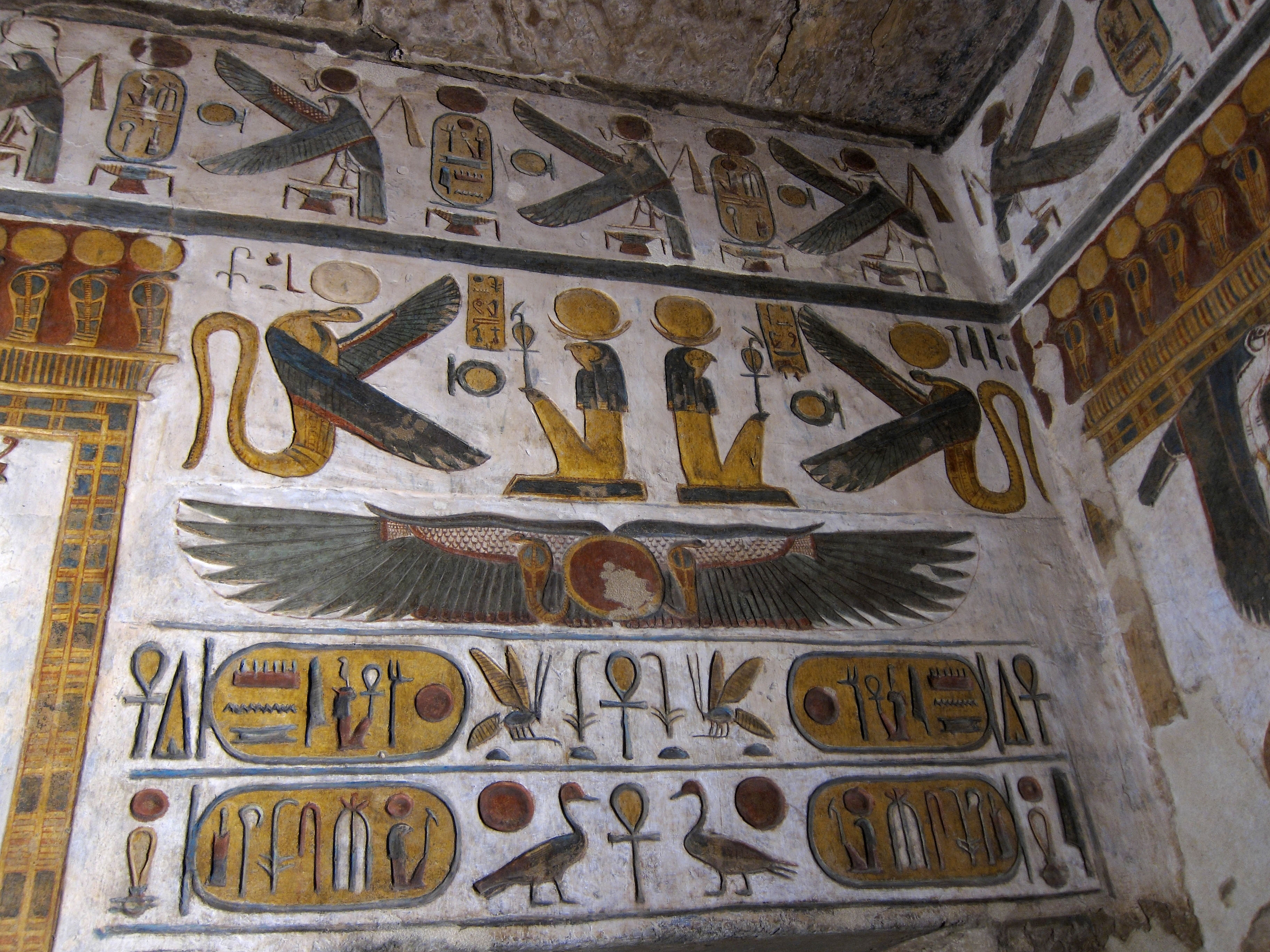
Finely painted reliefs from Ramesses III's Khonsu temple at Karnak

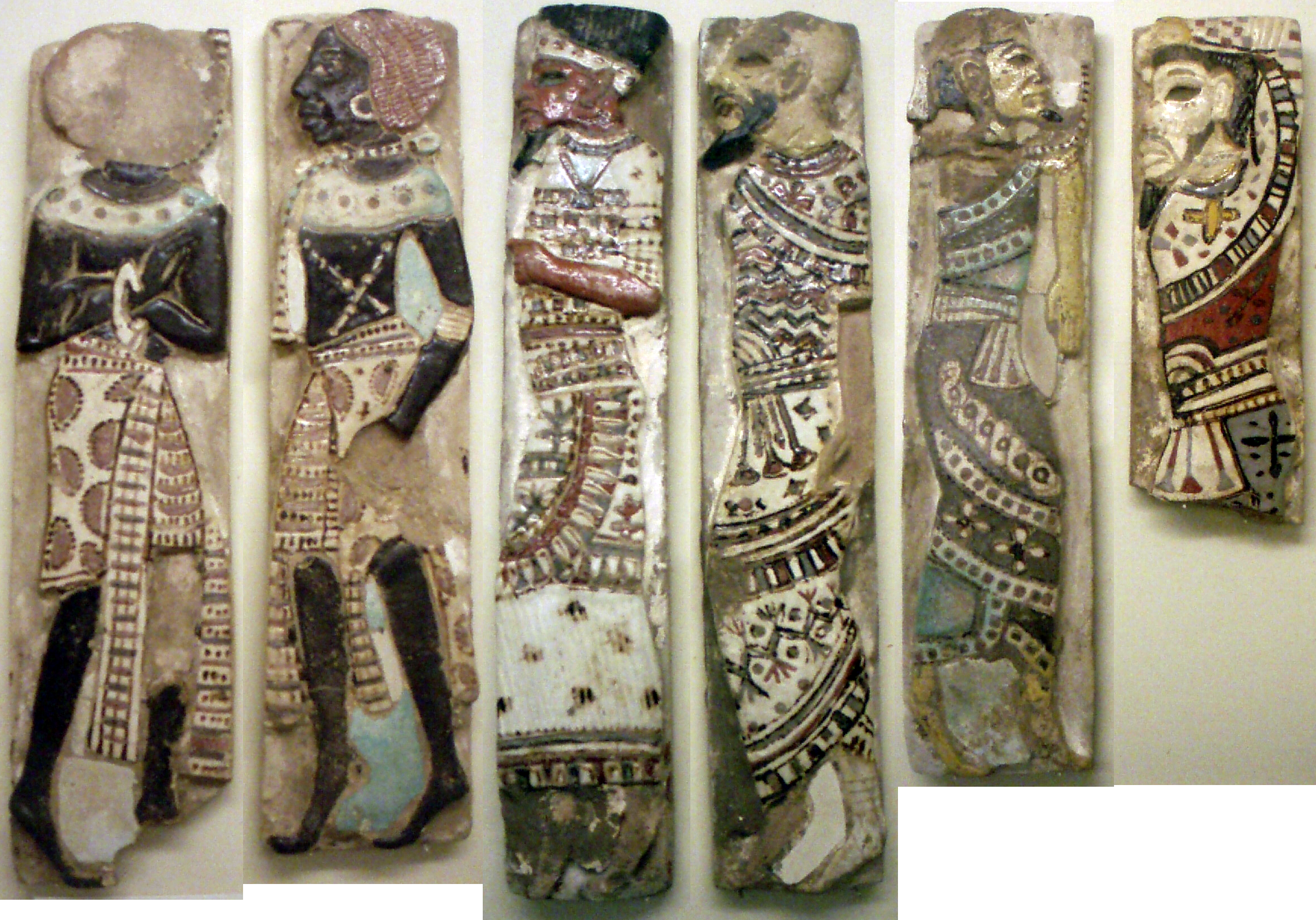
Ramesses III prisoner tiles: Inlay figures, faience and glass, of "the traditional enemies of Ancient Egypt" from Medinet Habu, at the Museum of Fine Arts, Boston. From left: 2 Nubians, Philistine, Amorite, Syrian, Hittite

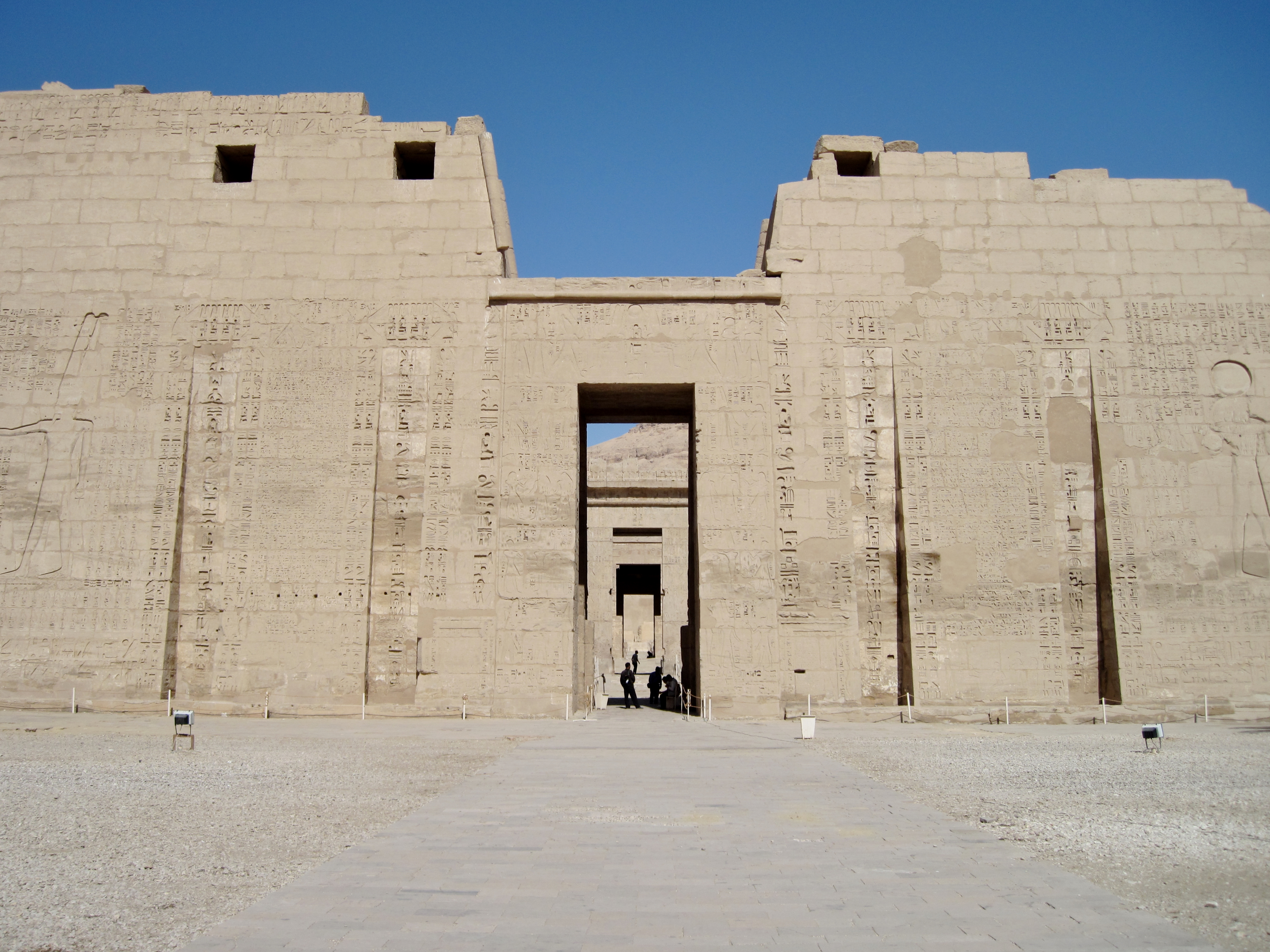
Ramesses III's mortuary temple at Medinet Habu.

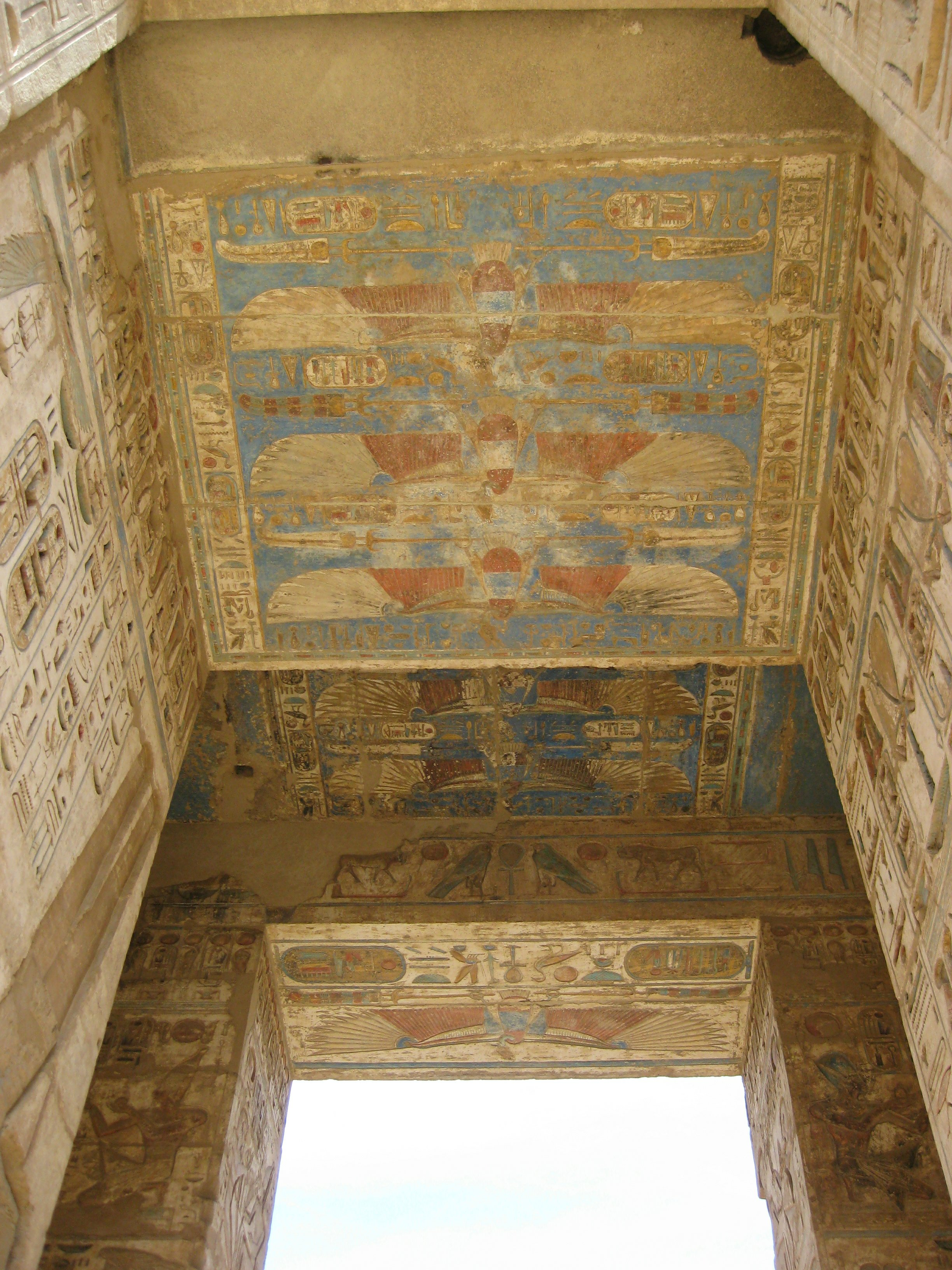
A painted ceiling of Nekhbet at Ramesses III's mortuary temple at Medinet Habu.

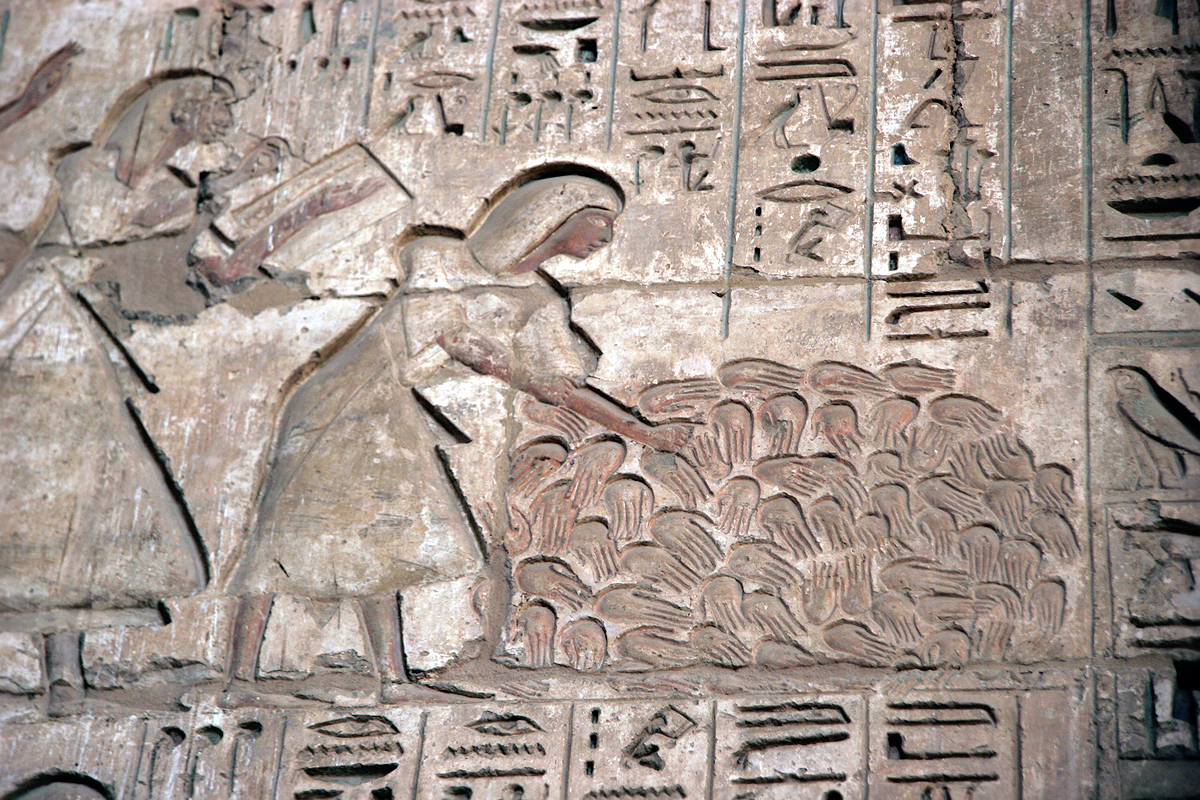
Medinet Habu – the severed hands of the defeated enemies

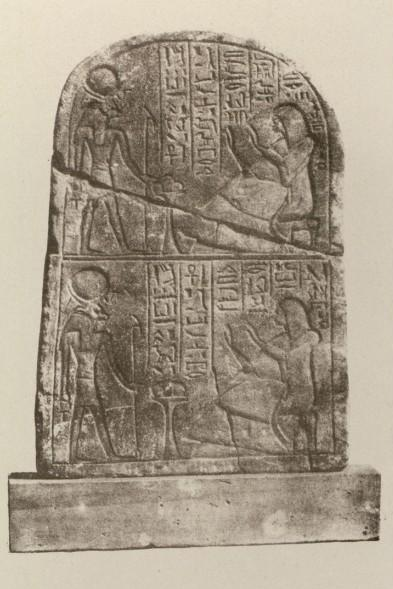
Stele (one of three) commemorating the death of an Apis bull under the reign of Ramesses III, 20th dynasty, New Kingdom. Found in the Serapeum of Saqqara, now in the Louvre Museum.

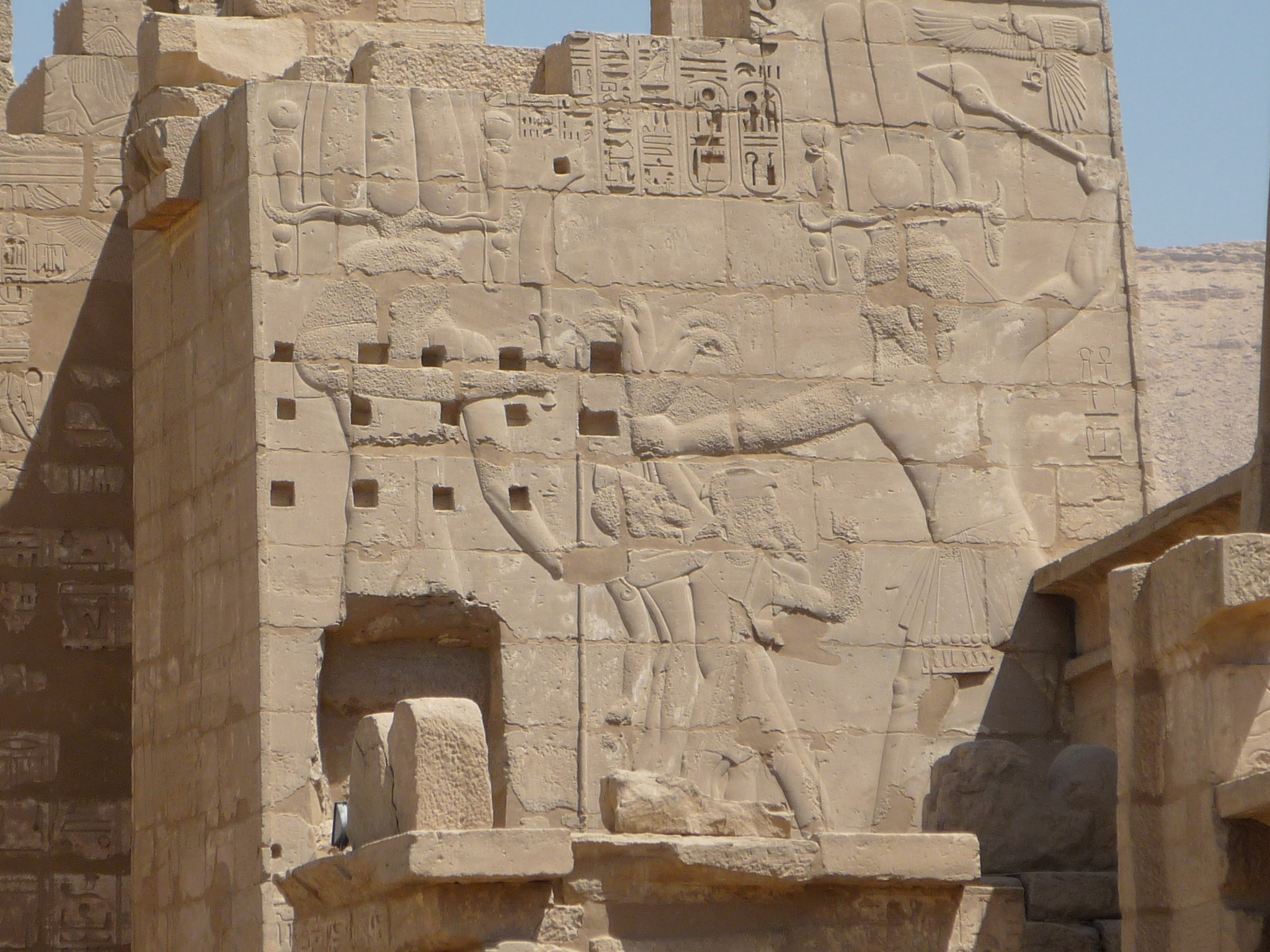
Wall relief of Ramses III on migdol of Medinet Habu, Theban Necropolis, Egypt

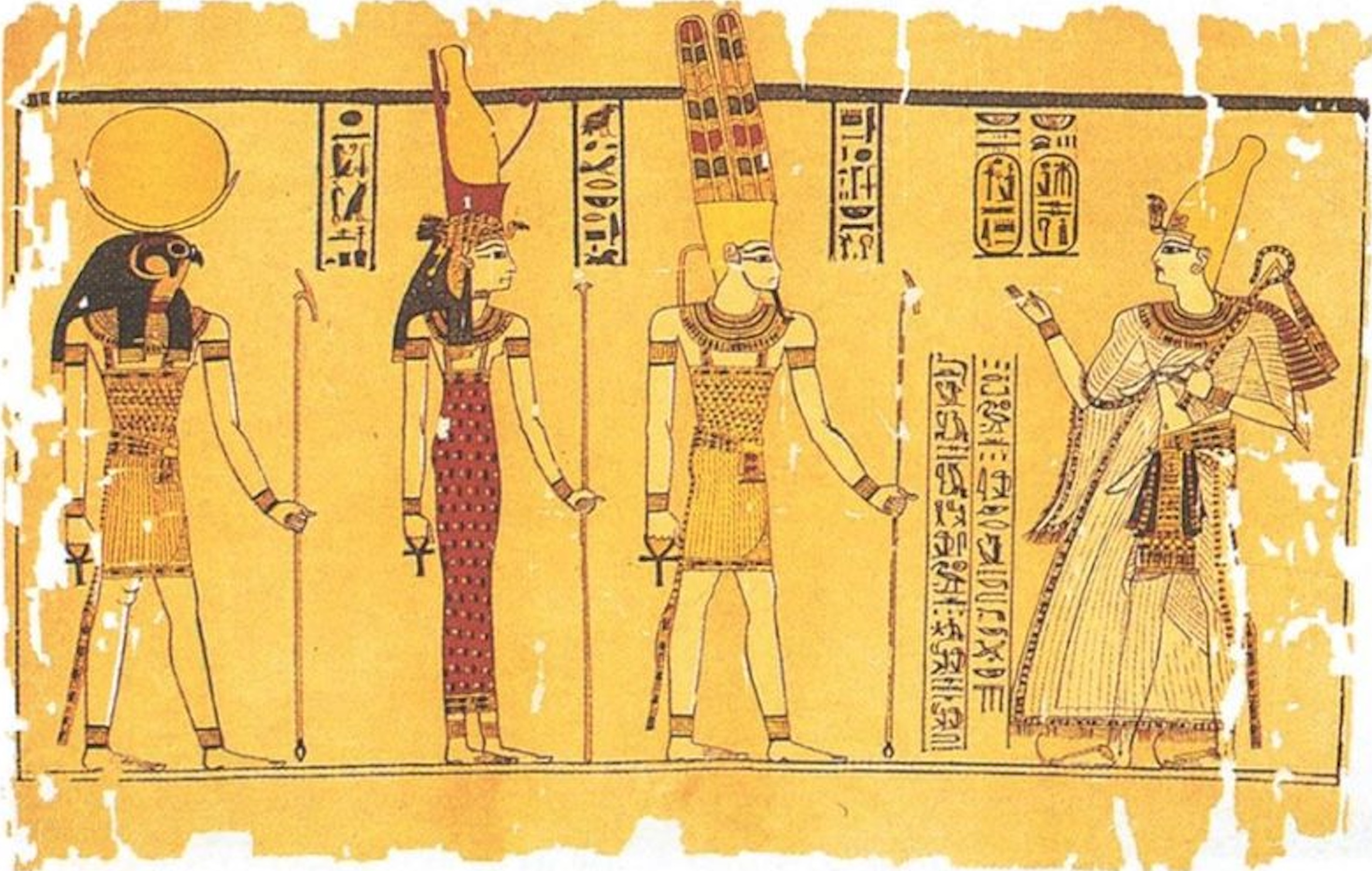
Ramesses III talking with the Theban Triad: Amun, Mut and Khonsu. The 'Great Harris Papyrus' at the British Museum, c. 1150 BC. Image taken from the book The Search for Ancient Egypt (p. 91) by Jean Vercoutter. In the text, Rameses III addressing to god Amun, I say the meritories adorations, the respectful homage and meritorous acts which I have performed to thee in presence, O king the gods!

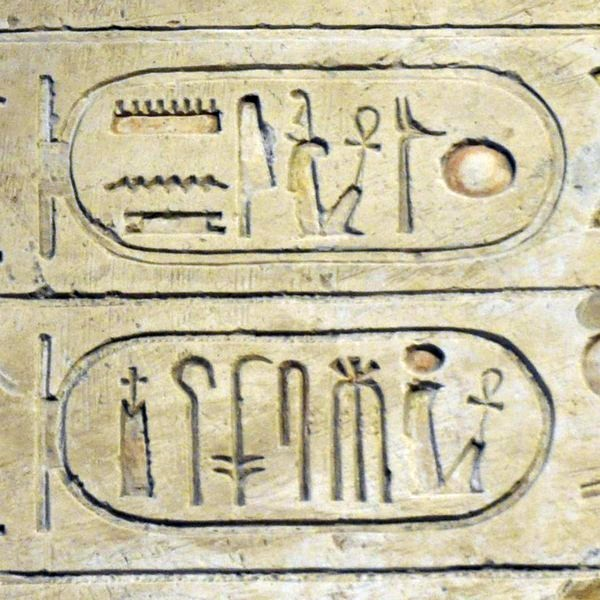
Cartouches of Ramesses III

Clay funerary plaque containing the royal titulary of Ramesses III
