= Deir el-Medina strikes =

Ancient Egyptian strike

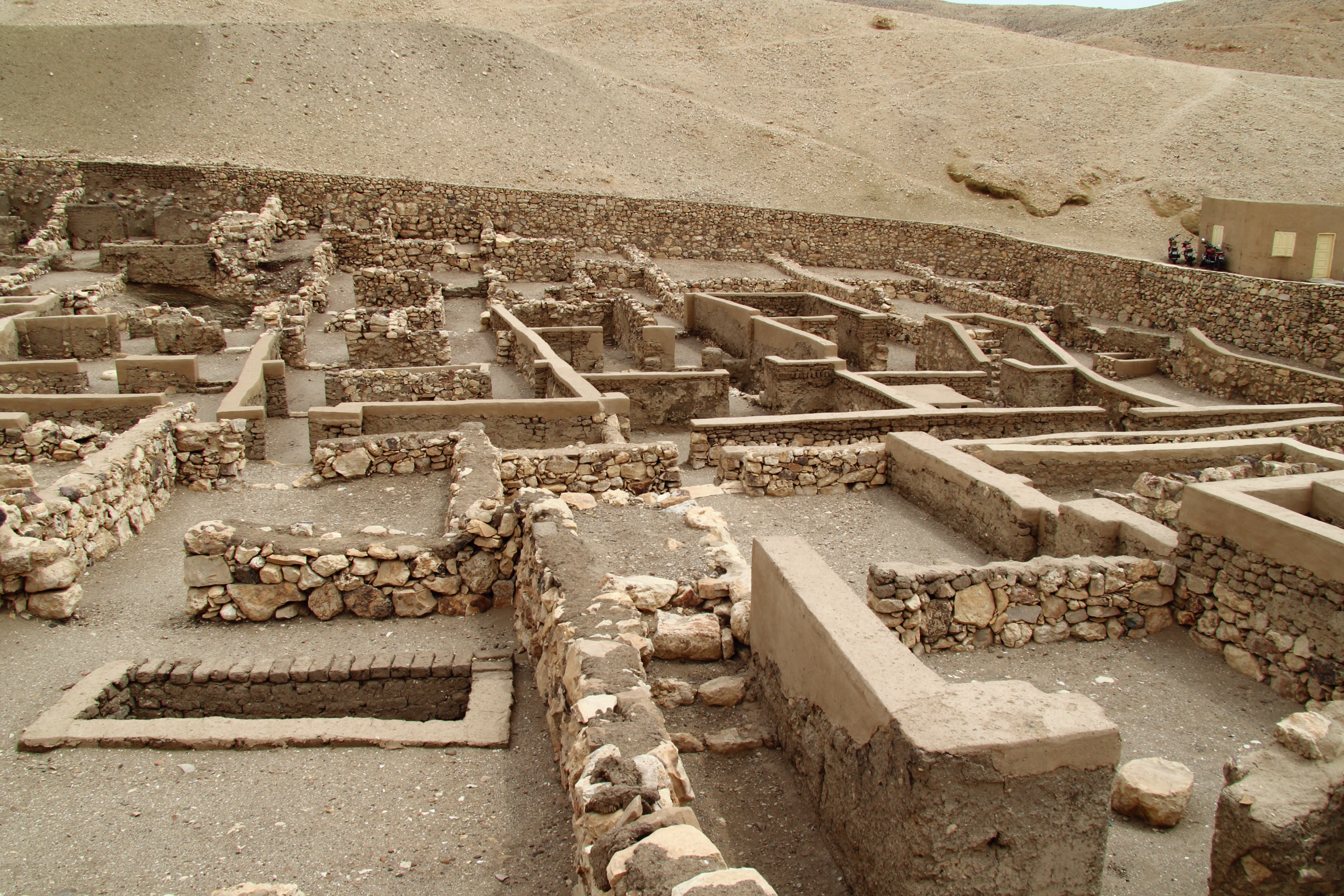
Ancient artisans’ village in Deir el-Medina

The Deir el-Medina strikes were a series of strikes by the artisans who worked on the tombs in the Egyptian Valley of the Kings, the most notable of which occurred in the 29th year of the reign of Ramesses III (circa 1158 BC). The primary cause of the strike was Ramesses' inability to provide supplies, including wheat rations, to the workers and their families, and workers were forced to buy their own wheat. The workers pleaded with the site officials, who ignored their complaints. The workers then went on strike and marched en masse to the office of the vizier, who authorised the release of grain from the funerary temples, and the workers returned to work temporarily.

The initial Deir el-Medina strike is considered the earliest recorded collective labour action. Labour problems continued in the 20th Dynasty due to price increases for grain.

== Background ==
=== Deir el-Medina ===
The community of artisans at Deir el-Medina worked on the construction and decorations of the royal tombs. The town was home to the workers and their families for roughly 450 years, beginning with the 18th Dynasty until the end of the 20th Dynasty. The workers were divided into various roles. The chief workman directed the workers and represented them as a group in any dealings with the authorities; they were approached concerning community legal matters, settled disputes, and received correspondence from the vizier. Deputies, four to each work group, acted as a member of the court (the Kenbet) and witnessed both legal and commercial interactions. The deputies also participated in investigated and inspections, especially those associated with strikes. Scribes, second in rank only to the chief, were responsible for the administrative progress of the tomb, for maintaining order, and were expected to encourage the artisans to return to work during the strikes; they reported directly to the vizier. The "captains of the tomb", a group of scribes and chiefs, wielded collective authority over the tomb and jointly distributed both grain rations and material for the workers; they were also responsible for the workers' behaviour and bringing them back to work from strikes. The workers were provided with male serfs, who received payment in grain from the scribes, and also with groups of women slaves, who were provided by the king to grind the workers' grain payments into flour on the grindstones in the village.

Workers resided in the village with their families but spent their days working in the Valley of the Kings, and therefore stayed in nearby huts overnight. They worked for eight days in two, four-hour shifts, with a lunch break at noon, and then returned to the village on the ninth and tenth days.

The community had its own police force, known as medjay, who were Nubian nomads in the Old and Middle Kingdoms, who both protected the workforce and were involved in ensuring good conduct from the workers.

Deir el-Medina was unique as an artisan, rather than agricultural settlement, where workers were well-paid and they and their families had a higher degree of literacy than villagers elsewhere. Workers were aware of their importance as the tomb-makers and decorators for kings and nobles; when their wages (food supplies) were in arrears, they could complain directly to the vizier (second in command to only the pharaoh) and later to the high priest of Amun at Karnak.

=== Economics ===
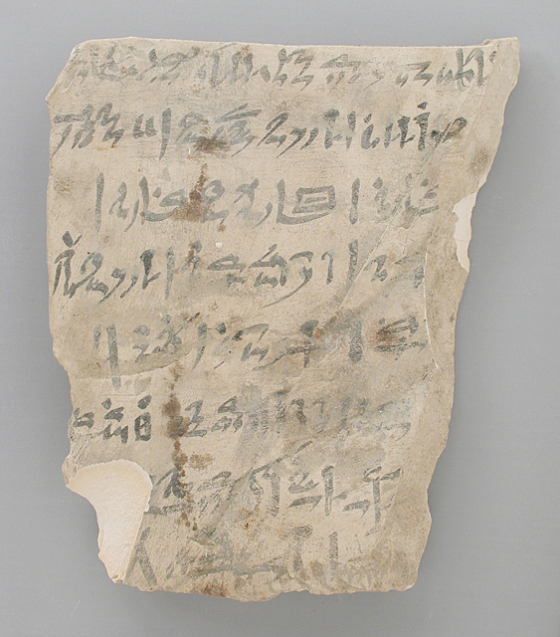
Ostracon detailing the delivery of provisions to Deir el-Medina

Circa 1178 BC, the Sea Peoples, a sea-faring confederation, attempted a massive invasion of Egypt, following two previous attempts to conquer Egypt, during the reigns of Ramesses II and his successor Merneptah. Although the Sea Peoples were previously defeated, the third invasion force was significantly larger and Ramesses' forces and resources were fewer. Ramesses III responded by instituting a kingdom-wide conscription campaign to bolster the military, and was ultimately successful in the Battle of the Delta. While Ramesses achieved victory, the battles cost a considerable number of Egyptian lives, resulting in, among other things, a loss of labour for the kingdom's farms and a smaller harvest.

During this period, there was evidence of grain inflation and it is suspected that a series of failed or diminished harvests impeded the ability of the ruler to pay workers throughout Egypt. Due to the large number of people employed by the government, and the hierarchy of officials who were paid first, it is possible that the grain meant for the artisans was already distributed to others by the time it would have reached the Deir el-Medina area. Additionally, it has been suggested that there was a policy of paying the workers at two levels, where workmen who had wives and families may have received a higher payment than those without.

Payments were made on the 28th day of the month for the following month, with the basic payment being made in grain. These payments were authorized by the vizier and drawn by the royal scribe from the granary of the king. The grain ration was composed of emmer wheat, which was made into flour, and barley, which was fermented into beer. Other payments included vegetables, fish, and water, as there were no natural water sources in Deir el-Medina. Other deliveries, made with less regularity, included dates, cakes, and beer; supplements for festivals or holidays included meat, salt, sesame oil, and natron. Payments were sufficient that families were able to barter supplies they had in surplus with each other.

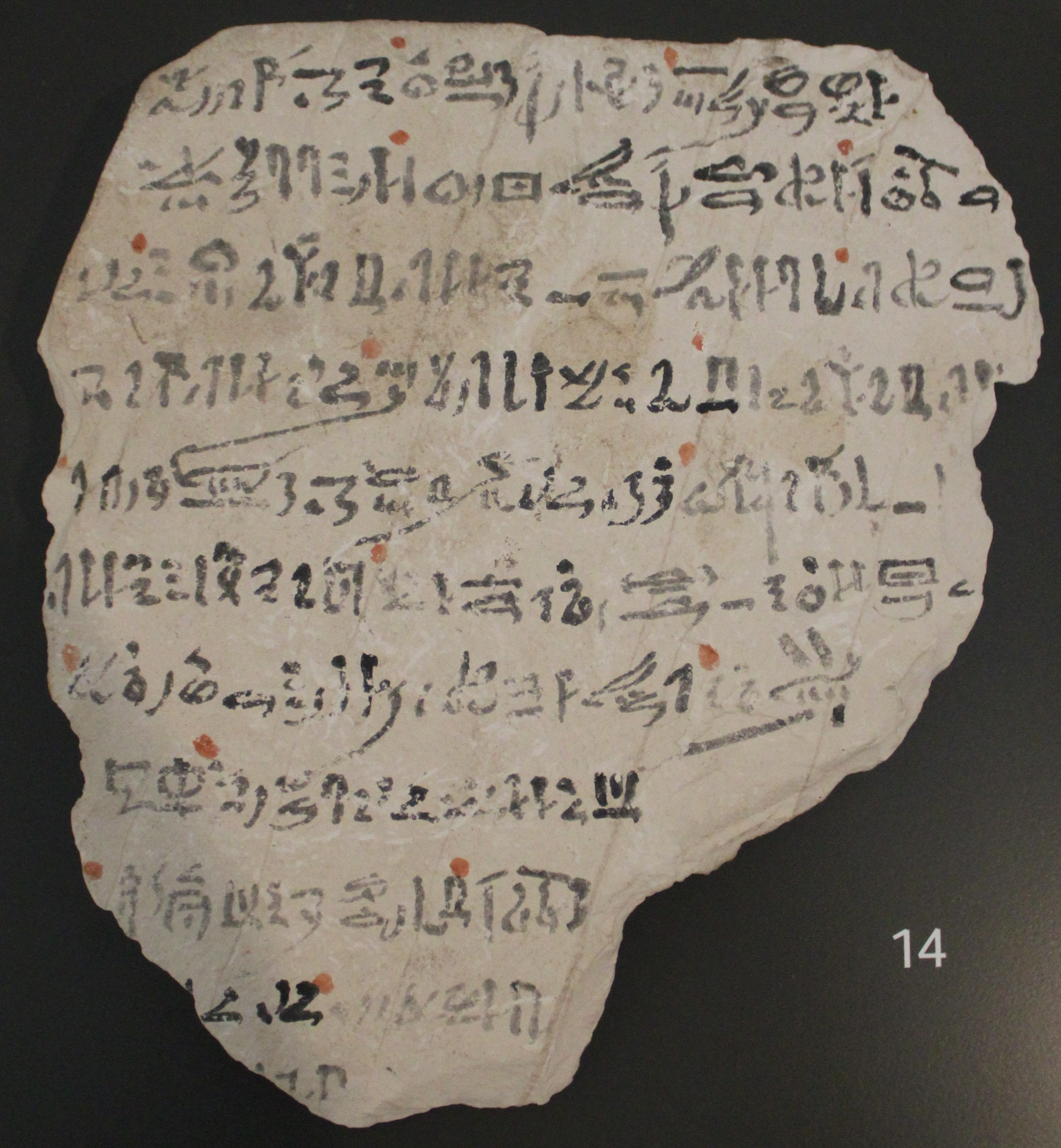
Fragmentary limestone ostrakon composed by scribe Amennakht

In 1156 BC, the workers' pay was late and a representative, Amennakht (or Amen-nakhte), a scribe, went to the mortuary temple of Horemheb and negotiated with officials to dispense 46 sacks of corn to restore peace. However this was only a portion of the rations the workers had been promised.

== Strike ==
The strike of the tomb-builders is believed to have started on the 21st day of the 29th year of Ramesses III's reign, over unpaid grain rations. Three strikes occurred in the same year, both in the daytime and at night by carrying torches. Despite negotiations via Amennakht the year prior, the problems continued until the workers went on strike. For the strike on the tenth day of the sixth month, the workers went to the funerary temple of Ramesses III at Medinet Habu, which was still under construction, and then to the temple of Thutmose III and staged a sit-in. They then went on to the Ramesseum, loudly demanding payment of grain rations, meat, oil, and vegetables. They stated that "we are hungry, for 18 days have already elapsed this month"; two days later, the striking workers stated, "the prospect of hunger and thirst have driven us to this; there is no clothing, there is no ointment, there is no fish, there are no vegetable. Send to Pharaoh, our good lord, about it, and send to the vizier, our superior, that we may be supplied with provisions". To placate the strikers, officials gave them the rations from the fifth month: on the 17th day of the sixth months, the chief artisan, the scribe, and eight men received a total of 44 bushels. Despite the fact that the majority of workers received no rations, the workers collectively agreed to resume work.

However, a few weeks later in the seventh month, rations again went unpaid. The workers stopped work again and refused to return, stating that their strikes were no longer about hunger, but rather that the failure to deliver their rations was tantamount to "evil", or disorder, and this was justifiable reason for striking. The vizier arrived to speak to the striking workers and gave them half the rations, appealing to them to understand that the Pharaoh's granaries were effectively empty. On the second day of the ninth month, the workers were given only two bushels of their emmer wheat provisions for the month, and were reported as having been on strike on the 13th day.

After threatening to call the vizier through their own personal channels, the artisans finally received payment in full.

Mandeville (2010) suggests that, because delays in the deliveries of rations was not uncommon, the delays were acceptable as long as the rations were delivered in the same month, rather than on the scheduled day of their allocation.

=== Records of the strikes ===
A letter from the 29th year of the reign of Ramesses III was written by the pharaoh by the scribe Neferhotep:

We are exceedingly impoverished. All supplies for us that are (from) the treasury, that are from the granary, and that are (from) the storehouse have been allowed to be exhausted. Not light is a load of dn-stone. Six oipe [an Egyptian unit of measurement] of grain have been taken away from us besides to be given to us as six oipe of dirt.

Let our lord make for us a means for keeping alive. Indeed we are dying besides. We do not live at all. It [i.e., the means of keeping alive] is not given to us in (the form of) anything whatsoever.

Most of the surviving records of the later Ramesside Period comes from the south of Egypt, including Thebes where the strike occurred, where archaeological evidence and material were better preserved by the aridity than in the delta north.

== Consequences ==
The Ramesside period strikes are the first known, fully documented record of a collective workforce protest.

The strikes at Deir el-Medina, in Thebes, demonstrated the increasing weakness of the palace, and specifically the vizier, as an institution. Because of the palace's inability to cover the regional responsibilities throughout Egypt, unpaid workers looked to local institutions to fill the power vacuum. The Deir el-Medina artisans looked to the high priest of Amun and the mayor of western Thebes, with access to untapped storerooms in Karnak that had not yet been depleted, as new patrons.
