= Hery-maat =

Egyptian deity

Name in hieroglyphs
D2 r y U7 S D36 t H8 B1

Hery-maat (pronounced [/hĕrē/ma’at/]; Egyptian; Ḥrii mȝʾt) meaning "the one who is upon Maat or the one who dominates it" is a funerary deity in ancient Egypt. Hery-maat takes appearance as a naked boy, sitting on a cushion representing the hieroglyph for “horizon”(𓈌). He is always depicted wearing a khat headdress. he has his arm holding his shoulder and his other arm resting on his knee.

He is found alongside Nebnerou in many tomb paintings, specifically the Valley of the Queens. He is a representation of the deceased tomb owner waiting under the protection of Nebnerou for dawn.
