= Nebnerou =

Ancient Egyptian deity

- a depiction of Nebnerou as a lion headed man holding a knife
Name in hieroglyphs
nb n r w i i nr Z2 A40

Nebnerou also spelled Neb-nerou or Nebneru (phonetic: /Nĕb/ nĕruː/, Egyptian: nb nrii, nb nryw or nb nrwii – "lord of fear or terror") is an ancient Egyptian deity associated with guarding tombs and the afterlife. He takes the appearance of a lion or lioness-headed man with one arm outstretched and in the opposite hand he holds a knife, showing his ferocious nature as a protector deity. He is often depicted alongside Hery-maat.

In tomb paintings, Nebnerou has his arm outstretched pointing towards the corridor leading to the burial chamber and symbolically represents him showing the way to the afterlife. In the New Kingdom, lionesses represented protectors, linking with the theme of protecting the deceased in the afterlife.

Nebnerou also takes appearance as one of the gate deities of the underworld.
