= Meryamun (20th dynasty) =

Meryamun (full name Ramses Meryamun) was a son of Ramses III, an Egyptian pharaoh of the 20th dynasty. He is depicted in the Medinet Habu temple with his brothers and half-brothers; nothing else is known about him.

== Sources ==
- Dodson, Aidan, Hilton, Dyan. The Complete Royal Families of Ancient Egypt. Thames & Hudson (2004). ISBN 0-500-05128-3, p. 193
