= List of assassinations in Africa =

This is a list of notable people who have been assassinated in Africa.

== Algeria ==
| Date | Victim(s) | Assassin(s) | Notes |
|---|---|---|---|
| 117 BCE | Hiempsal, co-ruler of Numidia | | Hiempsal's death was ordered by his cousin, Jugurtha. |
| December 24, 1942 | François Darlan, former Head of Government of Vichy France and High Commissioner of France in Africa | Fernand Bonnier de La Chapelle | |
| March 4, 1957 | Larbi Ben M'Hidi, Algerian nationalist and FLN leader | | Hanged by French Army officers under Paul Aussaresses; his death was initially passed off as a suicide. |
| March 23, 1957 | Larbi Tbessi, nationalist and president of the Association of Algerian Muslim Ulema | | Thrown from a building by French Army officers under Paul Aussaresses; at the time, his death was passed off as a suicide. |
| June 21, 1957 | Maurice Audin, Pied-noir and PC militant | | |
| March 15, 1962 | Mouloud Feraoun, writer | Organisation armée secrète | |
| October 18, 1970 | Krim Belkacem, politician | | Assassinated in his hotel room in Frankfurt. |
| July 8, 1976 | Gaston Marie Jacquier, Catholic bishop | Abdessalam Abdelkader | Stabbed in a crowded Algiers street while wearing full clerical attire. The assassin had a history of psychiatric problems, but was suspected by some to have been religiously motivated. |
| February 3, 1987 | Mustafa Bouyali, Islamic fundamentalist | | Ambushed by Algerian security services. |
| June 29, 1992 | Mohamed Boudiaf, Chairman of the High Council of State | Lambarek Boumaarafi | Shot at Annaba. |
| June 2, 1993 | Tahar Djaout, journalist, poet and author | | Killed by the Armed Islamic Group. |
| August 21, 1993 | Kasdi Merbah, former Prime Minister of Algeria | | |
| March 10, 1994 | Abdelkader Alloula, playwright | | Killed by two members of the Islamic Front for Armed Jihad. |
| September 29, 1994 | Cheb Hasni, singer | | |
| December 3, 1994 | Saïd Mekbel, journalist | | Assassinated with a car bomb in Aïn Bénian. |
| September 28, 1995 | Aboubakr Belkaid, former minister | | |
| May 21, 1996 | Seven Trappist monks of Tibérine | | The monks were kidnapped by the Armed Islamic Group in March 1996, and reportedly executed on May 21; others claim that the monks were accidentally killed by the Algerian army. See Assassination of the monks of Tibhirine. |
| August 1, 1996 | Pierre Lucien Claverie, Catholic bishop of Oran | | |
| October 22, 1996 | Ali Boucetta, Mayor of Algiers | | |
| January 28, 1997 | Abdelhak Benhamouda, trade unionist | | |
| June 25, 1998 | Lounès Matoub, Berberist singer | | |
| November 22, 1999 | Abdelkader Hachani, Islamic fundamentalist | Fouad Boulemia | Fouad Boulemia, a member of the Armed Islamic Group, was convicted for Hachani's murder and sentenced to death, but was later released. |

== Angola ==
| Date | Victim(s) | Assassin(s) | Notes |
|---|---|---|---|
| November 2, 1992 | Jeremias Chitunda, Vice President of UNITA | | Killed by government troops as part of the Halloween Massacre. |
| November 2, 1992 | Elias Salupeto Pena, UNITA senior advisor | | Killed by government troops as part of the Halloween Massacre. |

== Benin ==
| Date | Victim(s) | Assassin(s) | Notes |
|---|---|---|---|
| June 20, 1975 | Michel Aikpé, Minister of the Interior | | |

== Burkina Faso ==
| Date | Victim(s) | Assassin(s) | Notes |
|---|---|---|---|
| October 15, 1987 | Thomas Sankara, Head of State of Burkina Faso | | Killed in the 1987 Burkina Faso coup d'état organised by Blaise Compaoré. |
| December 13, 1998 | Norbert Zongo, journalist | | |

== Burundi ==
| Date | Victim(s) | Assassin(s) | Notes |
|---|---|---|---|
| October 13, 1961 | Louis Rwagasore, Prime Minister of Burundi | Georges Kageorgis | |
| January 15, 1965 | Pierre Ngendandumwe, Prime Minister of Burundi | | |
| December 15, 1965 | Joseph Bamina, Prime Minister of Burundi | | Killed during the 1965 Burundian coup d'état attempt |
| April 29, 1972 | Ntare V Ndizeye, deposed King of Burundi | | |
| October 21, 1993 | Melchior Ndadaye, President of Burundi, founder of the Burundi Workers' Party | | Overthrown and killed in the 1993 Burundian coup d'état attempt |
| March 11, 1995 | Ernest Kabushemeye, Minister for Mines and Energy | | |
| September 9, 1996 | Joachim Ruhuna, Roman Catholic archbishop of Gitega | | |
| November 20, 2001 | Kassi Manlan, World Health Organization representative | | Murdered in a conspiracy after discovering that aid money was being diverted into private accounts. |
| January 1, 2017 | Emmanuel Niyonkuru, Minister of Water and the Environment | | Assassinated in Bujumbura. |

== Cameroon ==
| Date | Victim(s) | Assassin(s) | Notes |
|---|---|---|---|
| September 13, 1958 | Ruben Um Nyobé, anti-colonialist leader and founder of the Union of the Peoples of Cameroon | | Killed by the French Army |
| November 3, 1958 | Félix-Roland Moumié, anti-colonialist leader of the Union of the Peoples of Cameroon | | Killed by the SDECE |

== Central African Republic ==
| Date | Victim(s) | Assassin(s) | Notes |
|---|---|---|---|
| December 4, 1996 | Christophe Grelombe, government minister | | |

== Chad ==
| Date | Victim(s) | Assassin(s) | Notes |
|---|---|---|---|
| April 13, 1975 | François Tombalbaye, President of Chad | | Killed during the 1975 Chadian coup d'état |
| October 22, 1993 | Abbas Koty, rebel leader | | |
| April 20, 2021 | Idriss Déby, President of Chad | | Killed in the 2021 Northern Chad offensive |

== Comoros ==
| Date | Victim(s) | Assassin(s) | Notes |
|---|---|---|---|
| May 29, 1978 | Ali Soilih, former President of Comoros | | Killed after being overthrown in a coup |
| November 26, 1989 | Ahmed Abdallah, President of Comoros | | Overthrown in a coup. |
| June 13, 2010 | Combo Ayouba, army chief of staff and former interim head of state | | |

== Republic of the Congo ==
| Date | Victim(s) | Assassin(s) | Notes |
|---|---|---|---|
| March 18, 1977 | Marien Ngouabi, President of the Congo | Barthélemy Kikadidi and others | Shot in Brazzaville. |
| March 23, 1977 | Émile Cardinal Biayenda, Roman Catholic archbishop of Brazzaville | | Abducted and killed by soldiers |
| March 25, 1977 | Alphonse Massamba-Débat, former President of the Congo | | Killed for his alleged involvement in the murder of President Ngouabi |
| August 28, 2004 | Angèle Bandou, former presidential candidate | | |

== Ivory Coast ==
| Date | Victim(s) | Assassin(s) | Notes |
|---|---|---|---|
| September 19, 2002 | Émile Boga Doudou, Minister of State for the Interior and Decentralization | | Killed in a coup that started the First Ivorian Civil War |
| September 19, 2002 | Robert Guéï, former President of Ivory Coast. | | Killed in a coup that started the First Ivorian Civil War |
| September 19, 2002 | Rose Doudou Guéï, wife of Robert Guéï and former First Lady of Ivory Coast. | | Killed in a coup that started the First Ivorian Civil War |

== Democratic Republic of the Congo ==
| Date | Victim(s) | Assassin(s) | Notes |
|---|---|---|---|
| January 17, 1961 | Patrice Lumumba, former Prime Minister of the Congo | Soldiers of the State of Katanga with the involvement of Belgian officials | Sent to the breakaway region of Katanga to be killed after being ousted in a coup led by Joseph Mobutu during the Congo Crisis |
| January 17, 1961 | Maurice Mpolo, former Minister of Interior, and associate of Lumumba | Soldiers of the State of Katanga with the involvement of Belgian officials | Sent to the breakaway region of Katanga to be killed after being ousted in a coup led by Joseph Mobutu during the Congo Crisis |
| January 17, 1961 | Joseph Okito, Vice-President of the Senate and associate of Lumumba | Soldiers of the State of Katanga with the involvement of Belgian officials | Sent to the breakaway region of Katanga to be killed after being ousted in a coup led by Joseph Mobutu during the Congo Crisis |
| January 29, 1993 | Philippe Bernard, Ambassador of France to Zaire | | Killed during an army mutiny in Kinshasa |
| May 6, 1997 | Mahele Lieko Bokungu, Commanding General of the Forces Armées Zaïroises | | Killed by Mobutu loyalists for attempting to negotiate a peaceful settlement with Laurent-Désiré Kabila during the First Congo War |
| January 16, 2001 | Laurent-Désiré Kabila, President of the Democratic Republic of the Congo | Rashidi Muzele | Killed by one of his bodyguards |
| February 22, 2021 | Luca Attanasio, Italian Ambassador to the Democratic Republic of the Congo | Democratic Forces for the Liberation of Rwanda (suspected) | Killed in an ambush in Goma |

== Egypt ==
| Date | Victim(s) | Assassin(s) | Notes |
|---|---|---|---|
| 1962 BC | Amenemhat I, Pharaoh of the Twelfth Dynasty of Egypt | | The identity of the assassin is unknown and the fact of the assassination is not entirely certain. Nevertheless, it is accepted as likely that he was killed in his bedchamber by members of his bodyguard as described in the Instructions of Amenemhat. The assassination of Amenemhat I is commonly cited as the first recorded political assassination in history. |
| 1155 BC | Ramesses III, Pharaoh of the Twentieth Dynasty of Egypt | Tiye, Pebekkamen, and other members of the Harem conspiracy | CT scans of his mummy show the king throat was cut deeply enough to strike bone, likely killing him immediately. The conspirators, who were attempting to install Tiye's son Pentawer on the throne, failed, and (according to the Judicial Papyrus of Turin) were tried and sentenced to death by the government of Ramesses's intended successor Ramesses IV. |
| 48 BC | Pompey the Great, Roman general and politician | Achillas, Lucius Septimius Salvius, and Julius Caesar | |
| 1121 | Al-Afdal Shahanshah, vizier of Fatimid Egypt | | |
| 1130 | Al-Amir bi-Ahkami l-Lah, Fatimid Caliph | | |
| October 24, 1260 | Qutuz, Mamluk sultan of Egypt | Baybars | |
| June 14, 1800 | Jean Baptiste Kléber, French general | Suleiman al-Halabi | |
| February 20, 1910 | Boutros Ghali, Prime Minister of Egypt | Ibrahim Nassif al-Wardani | |
| November 19, 1924 | Sir Lee Stack, Governor-General of the Anglo-Egyptian Sudan | | shot by Egyptian nationalists while driving through Cairo. |
| November 6, 1944 | Walter Edward Guinness, Lord Moyne, the UK's Minister Resident in the Middle East | Eliyahu Hakim, a member of Zionist group Lehi | |
| February 24, 1945 | Ahmed Maher Pasha, Prime Minister of Egypt | Mustafa Essawy . | |
| January 5, 1946 | Amin Osman, Former minister of finance. | A group of Egyptian army officers including Anwar Sadat. | |
| December 28, 1948 | Mahmud Fahmi Nokrashi, Prime Minister of Egypt | Abdel Meguid Ahmed Hassan | |
| February 12, 1949 | Hassan al-Banna, founder of the Muslim Brotherhood | State Security Investigations Service | |
| November 28, 1971 | Wasfi al-Tal, Prime Minister of Jordan | Black September | Shot by members of Black September during a visit to Cairo. |
| December 7, 1977 | David Holden, British journalist for The Sunday Times | Unknown | Found dead while visiting Cairo. Holden was suspected of secretly working for the CIA and the KGB. |
| October 6, 1981 | Anwar Sadat, President of Egypt | Khalid Islambouli | Shot while reviewing a military parade; see Assassination of Anwar El Sadat. |
| October 13, 1990 | Rifaat al-Mahgoub, Speaker of the Egyptian parliament | | |
| June 8, 1992 | Farag Foda, politician and intellectual | | Islamist movement al-Gama'a al-Islamiyya claimed responsibility for the attack. |
| June 29, 2015 | Hisham Barakat, Prosecutor General | | Killed in car bombing. |

== Equatorial Guinea ==
| Date | Victim(s) | Assassin(s) | Notes |
|---|---|---|---|
| November 14, 1932 | Gustavo de Sostoa y Sthamer, Spanish governor | | |

== Eswatini ==
| Date | Victim(s) | Assassin(s) | Notes |
|---|---|---|---|
| April 1, 2008 | Gabriel Mkhumane, political opposition leader | | |

== Ethiopia ==
| Date | Victim(s) | Assassin(s) | Notes |
|---|---|---|---|
| December 17, 1960 | Ras Abebe Aragai, Prime Minister | | Killed during a failed coup attempt |
| June 22, 2019 | General Se'are Mekonnen, Chief of General Staff of the Ethiopian National Defense Force | | Killed during the Amhara Region coup d'état attempt |
| June 22, 2019 | Major General Gezae Abera, Aide to General Mekonnen | | Killed during the Amhara Region coup d'état attempt |
| March 30, 2023 | Desalegn Bokonja, head of the Prosperity Party’s office in Nekemte | | |
| April 27, 2023 | Girma Yeshitila, head of the Prosperity Party in Amhara | | |
| May 8, 2023 | Omer Lemma, head of the Prosperity Party in Haruka Woreda, Afar Region | | |

== The Gambia ==
| Date | Victim(s) | Assassin(s) | Notes |
|---|---|---|---|
| December 16, 2004 | Deyda Hydara, journalist | | |

== Ghana ==
| Date | Victim(s) | Assassin(s) | Notes |
|---|---|---|---|
| April 17, 1967 | Emmanuel Kotoka, member of the National Liberation Council and Chief of the Defence Staff | | Killed during Operation Guitar Boy |
| June 30, 1982 | Cecilia Koranteng-Addow, Justice of the High Court of Ghana | | Abducted and killed along with two other justices by soldiers |
| June 30, 1982 | Frederick Poku Sarkodee, Justice of the High Court of Ghana | | Abducted and killed along with two other justices by soldiers |
| June 30, 1982 | Kwadwo Agyei Agyapong, Justice of the High Court of Ghana | | Abducted and killed along with two other justices by soldiers |

== Guinea ==
| Date | Victim(s) | Assassin(s) | Notes |
|---|---|---|---|
| January 20, 1973 | Amílcar Cabral, anti-colonial activist and Pan-African intellectual | Inocêncio Kani | Killed in Conakry. |

== Guinea-Bissau ==
| Date | Victim(s) | Assassin(s) | Notes |
|---|---|---|---|
| March 1, 2009 | Batista Tagme Na Waie, chief of staff of the army | | |
| March 2, 2009 | João Bernardo Vieira, President of Guinea Bissau | | Shot by soldiers during armed attack on his residence in Bissau in retaliation for the killing of Batista Tagme Na Waie |
| June 5, 2009 | Baciro Dabó, former Interior Minister and presidential candidate | | |
| June 5, 2009 | Helder Proença, former Defense Minister | | |

== Kenya ==
| Date | Victim(s) | Assassin(s) | Notes |
|---|---|---|---|
| February 25, 1965 | Pio Gama Pinto, journalist, anti-colonial activist and socialist legislator | | |
| July 5, 1969 | Tom Mboya, Minister of Economic Planning | | |
| March 2, 1975 | Josiah Mwangi Kariuki, Assistant Government Minister | | |
| January 3, 1980 | Joy Adamson, conservationist | | |
| August 20, 1989 | George Adamson, conservationist | | |
| February 13, 1990 | Robert Ouko, Foreign Minister | | Disappeared on February 12–13; found dead on February 16. |
| May 16, 1998 | Seth Sendashonga, former interior minister of Rwanda | | |
| August 23, 2000 | John Anthony Kaiser, Roman Catholic priest | | |
| March 5, 2009 | Oscar Kamau Kingara, human rights activist | | |
| March 5, 2009 | John Paul Oulo, human rights activist | | |
| April 30, 2025 | Charles Ong'ondo, Member of Parliament | | Shot dead by gunmen on a motorcycle in Nairobi |

== Liberia ==
| Date | Victim(s) | Assassin(s) | Notes |
|---|---|---|---|
| April 12, 1980 | William R. Tolbert, Jr., President of Liberia | | Killed in the 1980 Liberian coup d'état led by Samuel Doe |
| September 9, 1990 | Samuel Doe, President of Liberia | | Tortured and killed on the orders of Prince Johnson. |

== Libya ==
| Date | Victim(s) | Assassin(s) | Notes |
|---|---|---|---|
| July 28, 2011 | Abdul Fatah Younis, commander-in-chief of the armed forces of the Libyan Republic | Possibly security guards or members of the Obaida Ibn Jarrah Brigade | |
| October 20, 2011 | Muammar Gaddafi, de facto head of state from 1969 to 2011 | | Killed at the close of the First Libyan Civil War. See Death of Muammar Gaddafi |
| October 20, 2011 | Mutassim Gaddafi, national security advisor of Libya | | Killed at the close of the First Libyan Civil War. |
| September 12, 2012 | J. Christopher Stevens, United States Ambassador to Libya | | Killed in the attack on the U.S. Consulate in Benghazi |
| February 3, 2026 | Saif al-Islam Gaddafi, son of Muammar Gaddafi | | Killed at his home by 4 gunmen. |

== Madagascar ==
| Date | Victim(s) | Assassin(s) | Notes |
|---|---|---|---|
| May 12, 1863 | Radama II, King of Madagascar | rebelling soldiers | After Radama passed a controversial law allowing disputes to be settled by duelling, his palace was besieged on the orders of the Prime Minister, Rainivoninahitriniony. Radama was captured by soldiers and strangled with a silk sash; some historians believe he may have survived this attack and lived out the rest of his days in obscurity. |
| February 11, 1975 | Richard Ratsimandrava, President of Madagascar | | Shot six days after taking power in military coup. |

== Malawi ==
| Date | Victim(s) | Assassin(s) | Notes |
|---|---|---|---|
| February 3, 1915 | John Chilembwe, anti-colonial leader | | |

== Mali ==
| Date | Victim(s) | Assassin(s) | Notes |
|---|---|---|---|
| April 25, 2026 | Sadio Camara, Minister of Defense and Veterans Affairs | | Killed during the start of the 2026 Mali attacks. |

== Mauritania ==
| Date | Victim(s) | Assassin(s) | Notes |
|---|---|---|---|
| May 12, 1905 | Xavier Coppolani, French governor | Gudfiyya | |

== Mauritius ==
| Date | Victim(s) | Assassin(s) | Notes |
|---|---|---|---|
| May 10, 1965 | Rampersad Surath, Political activist | | |
| May 10, 1965 | Robert Brousse and Jacques Beesoo, Political activist and policeman in Trois Boutiques. | | |
| November 25, 1971 | Fareed Muttur, Political activist (MMM) | | |
| November 25, 1971 | Azor Adelaide, Dock worker and political activist (MMM) | | |
| 1986 | Cyril de Guardia, Raymond Desvaux de Marigny and Ambicaduth Sooknundun (Medine Sugar Estate executives) | Sténio Hervel (alias Piou Piou) | Piou Piou Hervel murders |
| 1996 | Babal Joomun, Zulfikar Bheeky and Yousouf Moorad Political activists (Labour Party) | Escadron de la mort | Gorah Issac murders |

== Morocco ==
| Date | Victim(s) | Assassin(s) | Notes |
|---|---|---|---|
| 10 July 1971 | Ahmed Bahnini, former Prime Minister of Morocco | | Killed during the 1971 Moroccan coup d'état attempt |
| 16 August 1972 | Mohamed Oufkir, Minister of the Interior and Defense | | Killed after launching the failed 1972 Moroccan coup d'état attempt against King Hassan II |
| 18 December 1975 | Omar Benjelloun, socialist politician | Chabiba islamia | |

== Mozambique ==
| Date | Victim(s) | Assassin(s) | Notes |
|---|---|---|---|
| February 3, 1969 | Eduardo Mondlane, anti-colonial activist and leader of the pro-independence FRELIMO movement | | Killed by a parcel bomb. |
| August 17, 1982 | Ruth First, South African communist | | Killed by a parcel bomb sent by South African Police |
| November 22, 2000 | Carlos Cardoso, journalist | Nyimpine Chissano and Anibal dos Santos | Shot while investigating allegations of corruption in Mozambique's largest bank. Chissano and dos Santos were charged with orchestrating the murder. |

== Namibia ==
| Date | Victim(s) | Assassin(s) | Notes |
|---|---|---|---|
| March 27, 1978 | Clemens Kapuuo, Herero chief and politician | | |
| September 12, 1989 | Anton Lubowski, leading white SWAPO activist | | Shot in front of his home in central Windhoek, allegedly by members of the government's Civilian Co-Operation Bureau. |

== Niger ==
| Date | Victim(s) | Assassin(s) | Notes |
|---|---|---|---|
| April 9, 1999 | Ibrahim Baré Maïnassara, President of Niger | | Ambushed by soldiers. |

== Nigeria ==
| Date | Victim(s) | Assassin(s) | Notes |
|---|---|---|---|
| January 15, 1966 | Abubakar Tafawa Balewa, Prime Minister of Nigeria | | Killed during the 1966 Nigerian coup d'état |
| January 15, 1966 | Ahmadu Bello, Premier of Northern Nigeria | | Killed during the 1966 Nigerian coup d'état |
| January 15, 1966 | Samuel Akintola, Premier of Western Nigeria | | Killed during the 1966 Nigerian coup d'état |
| January 15, 1966 | Festus Okotie-Eboh, Finance Minister of Nigeria | | Killed during the 1966 Nigerian coup d'état |
| July 29, 1966 | Adekunle Fajuyi, Military Governor of Western Nigeria | | Killed during the 1966 Nigerian counter-coup led by Theophilus Danjuma. |
| July 29, 1966 | Johnson Aguiyi-Ironsi, Head of State of Nigeria | | Killed during the 1966 Nigerian counter-coup |
| February 13, 1976 | Murtala Mohammed, Head of State of Nigeria | | Killed in an attempted coup led by Buka Suka Dimka. |
| October 19, 1986 | Dele Giwa, journalist | | |
| June 4, 1996 | Kudirat Abiola, pro-democracy activist and wife of presidential candidate Moshood Abiola | | |
| December 23, 2001 | Bola Ige, Justice Minister | | |
| October 16, 2011 | Modu Bintube, Borno state legislator | | Suspected to have been killed by Boko Haram militants. |
| July 2, 2016 | Gideon Aremu, Oyo State legislator and lawmaker. | | |

== Rwanda ==
| Date | Victim(s) | Assassin(s) | Notes |
|---|---|---|---|
| December 26, 1985 | Dian Fossey, primatologist | | Possibly killed by gorilla poachers. |
| April 6, 1994 | Juvénal Habyarimana, President of Rwanda, and Cyprien Ntaryamira, President of Burundi | | Plane carrying the two leaders shot down by unknown attackers with a surface-to-air missile. The attack was the catalyst for the Rwandan genocide. See Assassination of Juvénal Habyarimana and Cyprien Ntaryamira. |
| April 7, 1994 | Agathe Uwilingiyimana, Prime Minister of Rwanda | | Killed during the Rwandan genocide |
| April 7, 1994 | Joseph Kavaruganda, President of the Constitutional Court | | Killed during the Rwandan Genocide |
| April 7, 1994 | Faustin Rucogoza, Minister of Information | | Killed during the Rwandan Genocide |
| April 20, 1994 | Rosalie Gicanda, Queen Dowager of Rwanda | | Killed during the Rwandan Genocide |
| May 1994 | Jean-Baptiste Habyalimana, Prefect of Butare Province and then the only Tutsi prefect in Rwanda | | Killed during the Rwandan Genocide |
| June 1994 | André Kameya, journalist and Secretary-General of the Parti Libéral | | Killed during the Rwandan Genocide |

== Senegal ==
| Date | Victim(s) | Assassin(s) | Notes |
|---|---|---|---|
| February 3, 1967 | Demba Diop, Youth and Sport Minister and Mayor of M'Bour | Abdou N'Daffa Faye | |

== Somalia ==
| Date | Victim(s) | Assassin(s) | Notes |
|---|---|---|---|
| April 16, 1957 | Kamal Al Din Salah, chairman of the UN Advisory Council on Italian Somaliland | | Shot by a Somalian |
| October 15, 1969 | Abdirashid Ali Shermarke, President of Somalia | | Shot by one of his bodyguards, possibly for personal – rather than political – reasons |
| July 9, 1989 | Salvatore Colombo, Roman Catholic bishop of Mogadishu | | |
| July 28, 2006 | Abdallah Isaaq Deerow, former acting President of Somalia | | |
| June 17, 2009 | Ali Said, Mogadishu police chief | | |
| June 18, 2009 | Omar Hashi Aden, security minister | | Killed in the 2009 Beledweyne bombing, for which Al-Shabaab claimed responsibility. |
| June 10, 2011 | Abdishakur Sheikh Hassan Farah, interior minister | Haboon Abdulkadir Hersi Qaaf, Farah's teenage niece | Killed in a suicide bomb attack; Al-Shabaab claimed responsibility. |
| July 27, 2022 | Abdullahi Ali Ahmed Waafow, mayor of Merca | | Killed in a suicide bomb attack; Al-Shabaab claimed responsibility. |

== South Africa ==
| Date | Victim(s) | Assassin(s) | Notes |
|---|---|---|---|
| September 22, 1828 | Shaka, King of the Zulus | Dingane and Mhlangana, Shaka's half-brothers | |
| February 6, 1838 | Piet Retief | Dingane | During a diplomatic ceremony at Dingane's royal kraal, Dingane gave orders to kill Retief and his delegation, who were unarmed at the time. |
| September 6, 1966 | Hendrik Verwoerd, Prime Minister of South Africa | Dimitri Tsafendas | Tsafendas, a parliamentary messenger, stabbed Verwoerd to death with a dagger in the House of Assembly due to his opposition to Verwoerd's policy of apartheid. |
| November 22, 1977 | Robert Smit, economist and parliamentary candidate for the National Party | | |
| August 17, 1982 | Ruth First, anti-apartheid scholar and wife of Communist party leader Joe Slovo | | Killed by a letter bomb; her death was ordered by Craig Williamson of the South African Police. |
| May 21, 1985 | Vernon Nkadimeng, anti-apartheid activist | | |
| March 29, 1988 | Dulcie September, head of the African National Congress in Paris | | |
| May 1, 1989 | David Webster, anthropologist | Civil Cooperation Bureau | |
| April 10, 1993 | Chris Hani, leader of the South African Communist Party | Janusz Walus | |
| November 5, 1994 | Johan Heyns, prominent leader in the Dutch Reformed Church | | |
| January 22, 2009 | Mbongeleni Zondi, Zulu chieftain and politician | | |
| February 15, 2025 | Muhsin Hendricks, World's first openly queer Imam | 2 masked gunmen | |

== Sudan ==
| Date | Victim(s) | Assassin(s) | Notes |
|---|---|---|---|
| March 2, 1973 | Cleo A. Noel, Jr., US Chief of Mission, George Curtis Moore, Deputy Chief of Mission, and Guy Eid, Belgian chargé d'affaires | | Taken hostage and assassinated by members of Black September; see Attack on the Saudi Embassy in Khartoum. |
| January 1, 2008 | John Granville, diplomat for the United States Agency for International Development | | |
| June 14, 2023 | Khamis Abakar, Governor of West Darfur State | Rapid Support Forces (RSF) | Killed during the Battle of Geneina of the 2023 Sudan conflict |

== Tanzania ==
| Date | Victim(s) | Assassin(s) | Notes |
|---|---|---|---|
| February 3, 1969 | Eduardo Mondlane, Mozambican independence leader and founder of FRELIMO | | Killed by a parcel bomb |
| April 7, 1972 | Abeid Karume, 1st President of Zanzibar and 1st Vice President of Tanzania | | |
| June 12, 1979 | David Sibeko, South African black nationalist | | |

== Togo ==
| Date | Victim(s) | Assassin(s) | Notes |
|---|---|---|---|
| January 13, 1963 | Sylvanus Olympio, first President of Togo | | Killed in the 1963 Togolese coup d'état. |
| July 29, 1992 | Tavio Amorin, leader of the Pan-African Socialist Party | | Shot in Lomé on July 23, later died in a Paris hospital. |

== Tunisia ==
| Date | Victim(s) | Assassin(s) | Notes |
|---|---|---|---|
| December 5, 1952 | Farhat Hached, Tunisian labor unionist | | |
| April 16, 1988 | Khalil al-Wazir, military leader of the PLO | | Shot by Israeli commandos in Tunis. |
| January 14, 1991 | Salah Khalaf, deputy leader of the PLO | | Killed in Tunis. |
| February 6, 2013 | Chokri Belaid, Tunisian opposition leader | | |
| July 25, 2013 | Mohamed Brahmi, Tunisian opposition leader | | |

== Uganda ==
| Date | Victim(s) | Assassin(s) | Notes |
|---|---|---|---|
| September 22, 1972 | Benedicto Kiwanuka, former Prime Minister and Chief Justice of Uganda | | |
| February 17, 1977 | Janani Luwum, Anglican Archbishop of the Church of Uganda | | |

== Western Sahara ==
| Date | Victim(s) | Assassin(s) | Notes |
|---|---|---|---|
| June 18, 1970 | Mohamed Bassiri, Sahrawi leader and journalist | | "Disappeared" in June 1970, in El Aaiún; reportedly executed by the Spanish Legion. |

== Zambia ==
| Date | Victim(s) | Assassin(s) | Notes |
|---|---|---|---|
| March 18, 1975 | Herbert Chitepo, Zimbabwean nationalist leader | Hugh Hind | |

== Zimbabwe ==
| Date | Victim(s) | Assassin(s) | Notes |
|---|---|---|---|
| 1896 | Mlimo, Ndebele religious leader | Frederick Russell Burnham, British Army scout | Mlimo's death effectively ended the Second Matabele War. |
| 31 July 1981 | Joe Gqabi, South African ANC activist | South African Defence Force | |
| 24 March 1983 | Attati Mpakati, Malawian dissident | | |
| 22 May 2008 | Tonderai Ndira, member of the Movement for Democratic Change | | |

== See also ==
- List of people who survived assassination attempts
- List of assassinations by car bombing
- List of assassins, assassin, terrorist
- List of assassinated anticolonialist leaders
