= Pebekkamen =

Disgraced ancient Egyptian official

G41 G1 Z4 G29 V31 i A1 V31 G1 mn n D6 A1
Pebekkamen
in hieroglyphs
Era: New Kingdom
(1550–1069 BC)

Pebekkamen or Paybakkamen was an ancient Egyptian official during the reign of pharaoh Ramesses III of the 20th Dynasty. Along with Ramesses' secondary wife Tiye and the official Mesedsure, he was a primary organizer of the Harem conspiracy in 1155 BC. The conspirators intended to assassinate Ramesses and place Pentawer, Tiye and Ramesses' son, on the throne instead of his elder half-brother Ramesses IV.

The Judicial Papyrus of Turin indicates that prior to his arrest, Pebekkamen had served as "chief of the chamber" to Ramesses. Like the names of many other conspirators mentioned in the Judicial Papyrus, "Pebekkamen" (literally, "The blind servant" in Egyptian language) is actually an intentional distortion of his real name reflecting his execrable behaviour; his name is never revealed in the text, but presumably was "Pebekamen" without the double k, meaning "The servant of Amun".

Of his crimes, the court records state:

He was brought in because of his collusion with Tiy and the women of the harem. He made common cause with them, and began bringing out their words to their mothers and their brothers who were there, saying: "Stir up the people! Incite enemies to hostility against their lord." He was placed before the great nobles of the court of examination; they examined his crimes; they found that he had committed them. His crimes seized him; the nobles who examined him brought his judgment upon him.

== In modern popular culture ==
- Pebekkamen appears as a Great Spy in the turn-based strategy computer game Civilization IV.
