= Carlos Cardoso (journalist) =

Mozambican journalist (1951–2000)

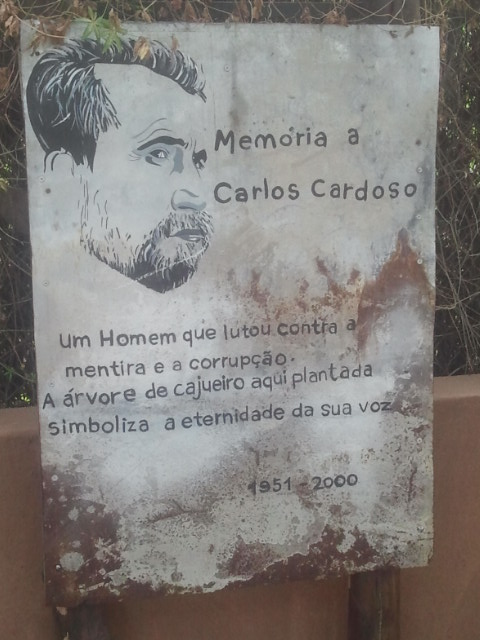
- A memorial at the location of his murder in Maputo
- Born: Carlos Alberto Lopes Cardoso; 10 August 1951; Beira, Portuguese Mozambique
- Died: 22 November 2000 (aged 49); Maputo, Mozambique
- Cause of death: Assassination by gunshot
- Education: University of Witwatersrand
- Occupation: Journalist
- Spouse: Nina Berg
- Children: 2

Carlos Alberto Lopes Cardoso (10 August 1951 – 22 November 2000) was a Portuguese-Mozambican investigative journalist. His assassination in 2000 followed his newspaper's investigation into corruption in the privatisation of Mozambique's biggest bank.

== Early life ==
Cardoso was born in Beira, the son of white Portuguese immigrants in colonial Mozambique, where his father ran a dairy processing plant. He was educated in Mozambique and at high school in South Africa, where he went on to attend the University of the Witwatersrand. He spoke Portuguese and second languages Ndau and English.

== Journalistic career ==
As a student, he became an activist against apartheid, leading to deportation from South Africa to Mozambique on 1 September 1975.

After the withdrawal of the Portuguese colonial administration from Mozambique in 1974 following the handover of power to the FRELIMO liberation movement in the context of the Lusaka Accord, Cardoso was among the minority of white Mozambicans who remained in the country. He worked first in junior positions in government media and, from 1980, as editor of AIM, the government press agency. Following a brief spell of imprisonment, Cardoso worked also as an advisor to Samora Machel, but quit AIM in 1989 to work first as an artist, and later as founder of Mediacoop, an independent press co-operative. In 1992 he founded the weekly newspaper Savana, which he left in 1997 to found a new business newspaper Metical.

In 1989 he met his wife Nina Berg, a Norwegian lawyer. They had two children together, Ibo and Milena.

In 1997, Cardoso founded the business daily news-sheet Metical, and was elected to the Maputo city council in 1998. Metical ceased publication in December 2001.

== Murder and investigation ==
Cardoso was shot dead in central Maputo on 22 November 2000, while investigating a US$14 million fraud connected with the privatisation of Mozambique's largest bank, Banco Comercial de Moçambique (Commercial Bank of Mozambique). In the 2002 trial of six murder suspects, three suspects described Nyimpine Chissano, the son of Mozambican President Joaquim Chissano, as paying Cardoso's murderer by cheque. Aníbal dos Santos, a Portuguese citizen who was said to have masterminded Cardoso's murder, was convicted in absentia in 2003 after escaping from prison; and a retrial in 2006 (following dos Santos' second escape) upheld his sentence of 30 years in prison.

Nyimpine Chissano was charged with "joint moral authorship" of Cardoso's murder and various economic crimes by the Mozambican Public Prosecutor's office in May 2006. The Mozambique News Agency reported on 11 May 2006 an anonymous claim that an arrest warrant for Chissano had been rescinded following the intervention of the former president and his wife.
