= Aníbal dos Santos =

- Born: 1971 (age 54–55)
- Occupation: Convicted criminal
- Known for: Convicted of masterminding the November 22, 2000, murder of Carlos Cardoso, a journalist investigating bank fraud in Mozambique's Central Bank (BCM)

Aníbal António "Anibalzinho" dos Santos Júnior (Aníbal dos Santos, born 1971 or 1972) is a Portuguese criminal convicted of masterminding the November 22, 2000, murder of Carlos Cardoso, a journalist investigating bank fraud in Mozambique's Central Bank (BCM). After a first trial in absentia in 2003, one failed and two successful escapes and two extraditions (from South Africa and Canada), dos Santos was sentenced to 30 years imprisonment in January 2006. Dos Santos maintained his innocence throughout the trial. As of April, 2008, dos Santos remained in Mozambican custody and was investigated in another attempted murder case, that of BCM lawyer Albano Silva.

December 7, 2008, dos Santos escaped from a maximum security Maputo jail for a third time. On the next day, the news media reported that dos Santos was arrested 36 hours after escape, but on December 10 a police spokesperson denied these reports, saying that dos Santos was still at large. After eight months at large, in August 2009 dos Santos was recaptured in South Africa.

== Background ==
In November 2000, white Mozambican Carlos Cardoso, 49, editor of the Metical daily newspaper specializing in investigating corruption, was investigating an alleged $14 million fraud at the Central Bank of Mozambique (BCM). On November 22, 2000, nearly 15 minutes after speaking to BBC reporters, he left his Maputo office in a car and was ambushed on the Avenue of the Martyrs by gunmen who blocked his escape routes with two cars. Later, trial judges adopted the version of events that dos Santos was driving the stolen ambush car that overtook Cardoso's Toyota and forced it to the curb; the shots were fired by another suspect. Witnesses said the shooters fired 10 shots, killing Cardoso and injuring his driver. The murder occurred two weeks after 26 people were killed in riots; Cardoso reported on the incident and was highly critical of both leading political parties' actions preceding the clashes. The murder and funeral of Cardoso "produced a rare show of unity among political opponents"; president Joaquim Chissano and opposition leaders vowed to solve the murder.

In May 2001 six men were charged with the murder. Initial reports stated that "a prominent businessman" and a bank manager were charged with contracting the murders and four men were charged with carrying out the murder. Later, Western media reported dos Santos was one of the four, the mastermind of the murder. Media reports of dos Santos' "normal" activities range from a petty car dealer to a car thief.

== First escape ==
August 31, 2002, dos Santos escaped from a jail in Maputo, despite specific warnings of an upcoming escape attempt reported to the Minister of the Interior. Unidentified police officers on the case said that "everything was done at the highest level to facilitate the escape and make a trial impossible". Dos Santos' lawyer expressed fears that dos Santos might already be dead and "there were reports of bloodstains in his client's cell". Actually, dos Santos escaped to South Africa on a false Swazi passport. Seven low-level prison guards were tried and acquitted in connection with the escape. The whereabouts of dos Santos remained unknown until November 22, 2002.

== First trial and extradition ==
The trial against the five present suspects and the missing dos Santos began November 18, 2002. Court sessions were broadcast on national TV. Three of the suspects identified Nyimpine Chissano, son of the president, as the man behind the murder. Nyimpine Chissano appeared in court and refuted all allegations. Soon after the trial commenced, the mother of dos Santos announced that her son was safely living in London. She said dos Santos "was helped to flee to London in order to prevent him from testifying", she also claimed that he was innocent and ready to return to Mozambique and testify if given security guarantees.

Dos Santos was arrested in Pretoria, South Africa, at the end of January 2003, one day before the scheduled pronouncement of court sentence in Maputo. South African authorities immediately announced that extradition would proceed "as early as [that] weekend". The next day the court declared dos Santos guilty as the mastermind of the crime, and sentenced him to 28 years and six months. Other suspects received up to 23 years. No charges where ever brought against Chissano family members.

In the end of 2003 three of the convicts, but not dos Santos, were reported to be involved in court proceedings against the fraud at the Central Bank — the last case of Carlos Cardoso.

== Second escape and extradition ==
According to the Ministry of Interior statement, "On 9 May 2004 Anibal dos Santos Junior disappeared from his cell." Anonymous sources at the prison said that dos Santos was "actually taken out of the jail by accomplices". The escape occurred when the court was preparing to pronounce verdicts against 15 suspects involved in the 1996 bank fraud case.

In the middle of May, Canadian authorities detained dos Santos at the Toronto Pearson International Airport. Mozambican authorities immediately requested extradition although Canada and Mozambique did not have an extradition treaty; international press organizations called on the Canadian government to "expedite [the] return of dos Santos" too. Dos Santos applied for political asylum in Canada, stalling the extradition process for half a year. Authorities persuaded dos Santos to drop the request for asylum in exchange for a fair retrial in Mozambique, an option open to anyone sentenced in absentia to more than two years in jail. The Mozambique court confirmed the convict's right to retrial. On December 14, 2004, Canadian authorities approved extradition, and dos Santos finally departed for Mozambique on January 21, 2005, arriving in Maputo the next day. Reporters without borders and other press organizations celebrated the capture.

== Second trial ==
The second trial against dos Santos commenced December 1, 2005. Three days before the trial, dos Santos was caught preparing to make a third escape. The attempt was thwarted by a new guard, recently transferred to the jail.

Dos Santos immediately pleaded innocent and not guilty and said that his previous statements on the Cardoso case had been the result of manipulation by his former defence lawyer. Dos Santos exonerated Nyimpine Chissano from any association with the murder and identified the Satar family members, already convicted at the 2002-2003 trial, as his principal clients. The trial pronounced dos Santos guilty on all nine counts and increased the sentence to 30 years.

Media reports commented that the trial did not solve many incident questions on the extent of dos Santos' connections in Mozambique politics and that dos Santos' decision not to appeal the sentence was an indicator of another jailbreak being planned. His court-appointed lawyer explained that his client feared that the appellate court could increase the jail term further.

== 2008 trial ==
In April 2008 dos Santos was in court again, this time as a defendant for the murder of BCM lawyer Albano Silva. His statement to the court addressed the 2000 Cardoso murder; this time, contrary to his past statements, dos Santos directly pointed at Nyimpine Chissano (by then deceased) as the ultimate client. According to the new statements by dos Santos, Chissano initially contacted him on to hire a car; commentators expressed disbelief that such a petty business could grow into a murder contract. The alleged "recruiter" identified by dos Santos has also died, leaving nobody to denounce or corroborate his story. He also made a statement that the late Chissano protected him in Maputo prison: "I never escaped, I was taken out".

Dos Santos refuted all allegations of the Albano Silva case, despite objective evidence showing his regular communications with the other suspects in the case prior to the murder.

== Third escape ==
On December 7, 2008, dos Santos escaped from a maximum security Maputo prison for a third time, together with two other notable gangsters. The next day, the media reported that dos Santos was arrested 36 hours after escape. According to Reporters without borders, he was apprehended 75 kilometers from Maputo, on the road to the border with Swaziland. However, on December 10 a police spokesperson denounced these reports, saying that dos Santos was still at large. The opposition requested that the national parliament summon executive ministers for an explanation, but the proposal was turned down by majority vote. Police officials, again, expressed regret over the incident, while the right-wing Zambese newspaper hailed dos Santos as a hero defying incompetent police.

In a period of less than a week ending December 17, three high-ranking Maputo police officers were killed. Police chief Pinto said that the murders may be connected to the escapees, however, it was not clear which of the three escapees is considered most dangerous. Ministry of Interior General Zinocacossa has openly blamed police for the escape: "Anibalzinho was released by police commanders ... They, there in the police, they're mixed up with Anibalzinho, and now they want to involve me".

On December 30, 2008, the Mozambican Interior ministry dismissed top-ranking police commanders for their part in the December 7 escape. It was reported that the officials visited Anibalzinho on the day before the escape and did nothing about the hole in the corridor wall that was used by the fugitives. .

== Recapture ==
On August 26, 2009, the Mozambican authorities confirmed the recapture of Anibal dos Santos in South Africa.
