= Pan-African Socialist Party =

Political party in Togo

Pan-African Socialist Party (French: Parti socialiste panafricain, PSP) was a Togolese political party advocating socialism and pan-Africanism. It was founded in the early 1990s in response to Togo's legalization of opposition parties. After the assassination of its first and brightest leader, Tavio Amorin, in July 1992, the party fell into obscurity. The Togolese police were responsible for the killing.
