= Harem conspiracy =

Successful plot to murder Ramesses III

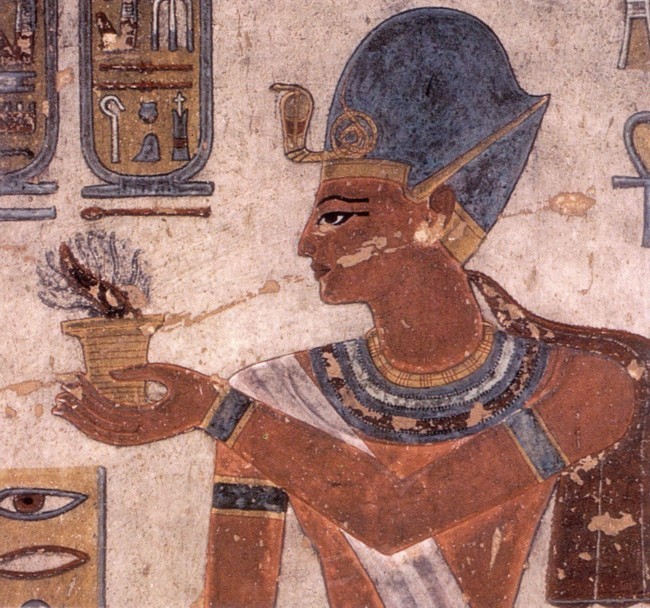
Ramesses III, victim of the conspiracy

The Harem conspiracy was a coup d'état attempt against the Egyptian pharaoh Ramesses III in 1155 BC. The principal figure behind the plot was one of the pharaoh's secondary wives, Tiye, who hoped to place her son Pentawer on the throne instead of the pharaoh's chosen successor Ramesses IV. The plot was mainly organized by the court official Pebekkamen. The plotters succeeded in killing the pharaoh but failed to establish Pentawer on the throne. In the aftermath, the leading conspirators were convicted and executed.

== Ramesses III ==
Ramesses III was born during the Twentieth Dynasty to the pharaoh Setnakhte and the queen Tiy-Merenese. His father Setnakhte came to the throne by rescuing Egypt from the hands of foreign powers. Setnakhte led Egypt into the Twentieth Dynasty. It is said that Ramesses III "entered life destined for the kingship and remained at the pinnacle of society and power throughout". Ramesses III ruled Egypt for 31 years. He had recently relocated to Thebes to celebrate the Heb-Sed, the rejuvenation festival that occurs after a king rules for thirty years and it continues to take place every three years thereafter. It was in Thebes where this great conspiracy was performed.

Unfortunately, Ramesses III made a major error in his family life by failing to clearly establish the order of succession among his sons. He did not respect their birth order, and after the death of his original heir Amun-her-khepeshef, the new heir he designated, Ramesses IV, was likely younger than another of his sons, Khaemwaset. This miscalculation may have led his second wife, queen Tiye, to believe that her own younger son could also bypass his elder brothers and become pharaoh, thereby enabling her to plot a conspiracy to murder the king within the royal harem.

== Conspiracy ==
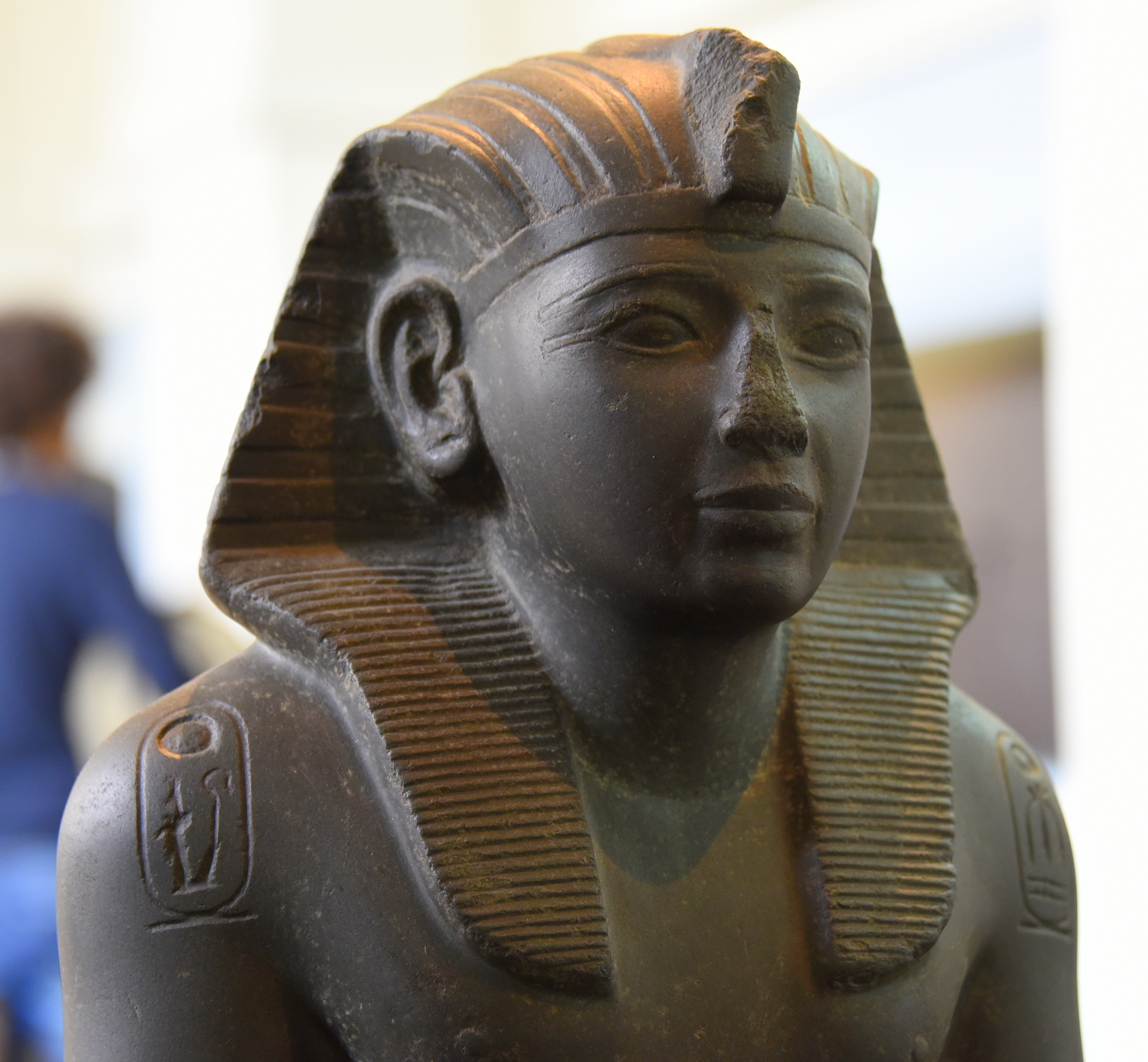
Ramesses IV, the appointed heir of Ramesses III

On day 15 of month 2 of Shemu 1155 BC, Ramesses III was likely in the royal harem in the Western Tower of Medinet Habu when the attempt on his life was made. This date was chosen as it coincided with the Beautiful Festival of the Valley; the commotion surrounding the event was used to the advantage of the conspirators.

A minor wife of the king, Tiye, wished for her son Pentawer to take the throne instead of Ramesses IV, the chosen successor. To achieve this, Tiye enlisted a group of officials throughout the administration, as well as servants, to help deliver messages beyond the harem. Tiye was also able to convince many of these officials to help act out the two-fold conspiracy. One of the pantry chiefs, Pebekkamen, was responsible for distributing information:

...he had begun to bring out their word to their mothers and their brothers who were there, saying: 'Stir up the people! Incite enmity in order to make rebellion against their lord!'

Pebekkamen (Note: Literally meaning "The blind servant" in Egyptian language, an obvious intentional distortion of his real name reflecting his execrable behaviour; his original name is never revealed in the Judicial Papyrus, but in all likelihood was Pebekamen, meaning "Amun's servant"..) received help from a butler named Mastesuria, (Note: Or more correctly Mesedsure, literally meaning "Ra hates him" in Egyptian language, an obvious intentional distortion of his real name reflecting his execrable behaviour; his original name is never revealed in the Judicial Papyrus, but in all likelihood was Mersure, meaning "Ra loves him"..) the overseer of cattle Panhayboni, overseer of the harem Panouk (Note: Or more correctly Panik, literally meaning "The Devil" in Egyptian language, an obvious intentional distortion of his real name reflecting his execrable behaviour; his original name is never revealed in the Judicial Papyrus.), and clerk of the harem Pendua (Note: Or more correctly Pendouaou, literally meaning "The creator of the apparition" in Egyptian language, an obvious intentional distortion of his real name reflecting his execrable behaviour; his original name is never revealed in the Judicial Papyrus.). Since the harem had very restricted access Panhayboni sought out the overseer of the King's treasury, Pairy, to obtain a pass that would allow the conspirators access to the king.

It was once thought that Ramesses III survived the initial attack, only to die some time later. This is due in part to the Judicial Papyrus of Turin, which preserves a record of the trials of the conspirators, being carried out under his name. The document opens with:

[King Usermare'-Meriamun, l.p.h., Son of Re': Ramesses] Ruler of Heliopolis [l.p.h. said]... I commissioned the overseer of the treasury Montemtowe; the overseer of the treasury Pefrowe; the standard-bearer Kara; the butler Paibese, the butler Kedendenna; the butler Ba'almahar; the butler Peirswene; the butler Dhutrekhnefer; the king's adjutant Penernute; the clerk Mai; the clerk of the archives Pre'em-hab; the standard-bearer of the infantry Hori; saying 'As for the matters which the people-I do not know who-have plotted, go and examine them'.

After giving the instructions to the judges, he then reports the following outcomes:

And they went and examined them, and they caused to die by their own hands those whom they caused (so) to die, though [I] do not know [wh]o, [and they] also punished [the] others, though I do not know who. But [I] had charged [them strictly], saying: 'Take heed, have a care lest you allow that [somebody] be punished (9) wrongfully [by an official] who is not over him'.

His mummy appeared to show no outward signs of any injuries and his death was presumed to be a natural one. However, recent CT scanning of his mummy reveals that his throat was cut to the bone, severing the trachea, esophagus, and blood vessels, which would be rapidly fatal. This finding confirms the theory that the trial of the conspirators was carried out by Ramesses IV in the name of his father, rather than by Ramesses III himself.

=== List of conspirators ===
Most of the names of the conspirators involved in the plot against Ramesses III were subsequently erased from monuments where they had been inscribed, and so some of their real names are lost. In judicial records such as the Judicial Papyrus of Turin, the names of the accused were altered into so-called “names of infamy.” These modified names preserved the original phonetic structure but inverted their meaning, effectively transforming them into curses.

The list below is taken from the Papyrus judiciaire:

Infamous name (Note: Name inscribed in the Judicial Papyrus of Turin)	Meaning	Real name	Meaning	Function
Pebekkamen	The blind servant	Never revealed, but most likely Pebekamen	Amun's servant	Chef de la chambre. (Note: i.e. head of the king's "valets de chambre")
Mesedsourê	Ra hates him	Never revealed, but most likely Mersure	Ra loves him	Cupbearer
Panik	The Devil	Never revealed		Harem master
Pendouaou	The creator of the apparition	Never revealed		Scribe to the Harem master
Karpaous	He who appeared in the apparition	Never revealed		Harem controller
Khâemopet	He who appeared in the Opet Festival	Never revealed		Harem controller
Khâemmal	He who appeared in Mal	Never revealed		Harem controller
Sethyemperdjehouty	Seth is in Thoth's Temple	Never revealed		Harem controller
Sethyemperamon	Seth is in Amun's temple	Never revealed		Cupbearer
Oulen		Never revealed		Cupbearer
Âshahebsed	He who is abundant in the Sed festival	Never revealed		Pebekkamen assistant
Palik		Never revealed		Cupbearer and scribe
Libou Yenen	The Libyan	Never revealed		Cupbearer
Six women		Never revealed		Wives of men at the Harem gate
Payiri, son of Roumâ		Never revealed		Head of Treasury
Hentouenimen	Mistress of Amun	Never revealed		Cupbearer
Amunkhâou	Amun's apparition	Never revealed		Harem substitute
Pairy		Never revealed		Scribe to the King's Chamber
Binemouaset	Evil in Thebes	Khâemouaset	He who appeared in Thebes	Leader of the Kush troops
Payis	The bald	Pahemnétjer	The priest	General
Messouy	He who is hated	Never revealed		Scribe in the House of life
Parâkamenef	Ra blinds him	Parâherounemef	Ra is on his right	Chief ritualist priest
Iyry		Never revealed		Ritualistic priest, chief priest of the goddess Sekhmet of Bubastis
Nebdjéfaou	The possessor of the apparition	Never revealed		Cupbearer
Shâdmesdjer	He whose ear is cut off	Ousekhnemtet	He whose walks so easy	Scribe in the House of life
Pentawer	He of the great woman	Never revealed		Son of Ramesses III and Tiye
Never given		Tiye		Ramesses III's wife

== Trial and outcome ==
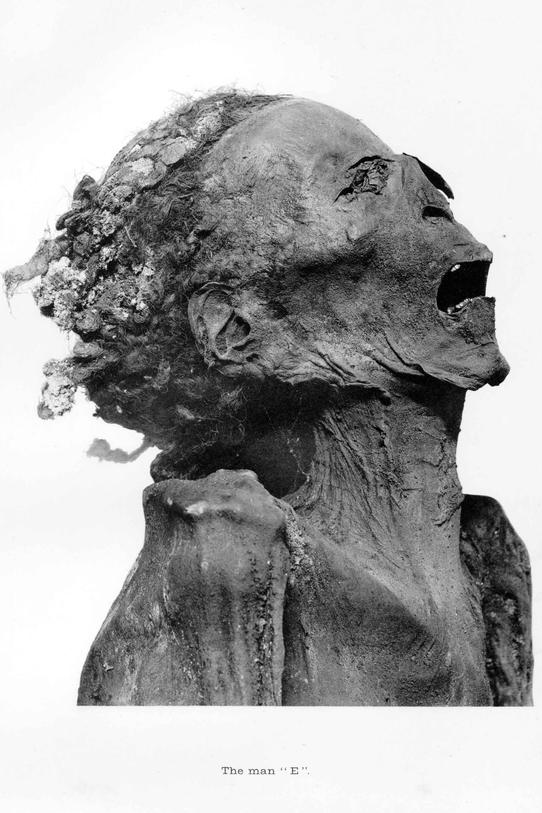
"Unknown Man E", believed to be the mummy of Prince Pentawer

Although the conspirators succeeded in murdering the king, the plot failed to place Pentawer on the throne. It is possible that other members of the royal family loyal to the future Ramesses IV reacted quickly to outmaneuver the conspirators. Ramesses IV selected twelve magistrates to investigate and judge the case across five trials. In addition to the chief conspirators named above, those aware of the conspiracy who failed to report it were also arrested, tried, and punished. Twenty-eight people were executed. These included Pebekkamen, Mastesuria, Panhayboni, Panouk, Pentua, and Pairy, in addition to other harem officials, scribes, and army officials. Some, such as Pentawer, were allowed to take their own lives. Four, including the two judges and the captain of the police, had their ears and noses cut off for cavorting with the accused women. The punishment of queen Tiye is not recorded.

The mummy known as 'Unknown Man E' is generally considered to be a son of Ramesses III. The body was not embalmed, but wrapped in a ritually impure goatskin and placed in an uninscribed coffin. Genetic studies confirmed he has the same Y-chromosome haplotype (E1b1a) and shares half his autosomal DNA with Ramesses III, consistent with being his son. It appears that this mummy is that of Pentawer.

== See also ==
- Conspiracies in ancient Egypt
