= Ramesses IV =

Third pharaoh of the Twentieth Dynasty of the New Kingdom of Ancient Egypt

- Ramses IV, Rameses IV
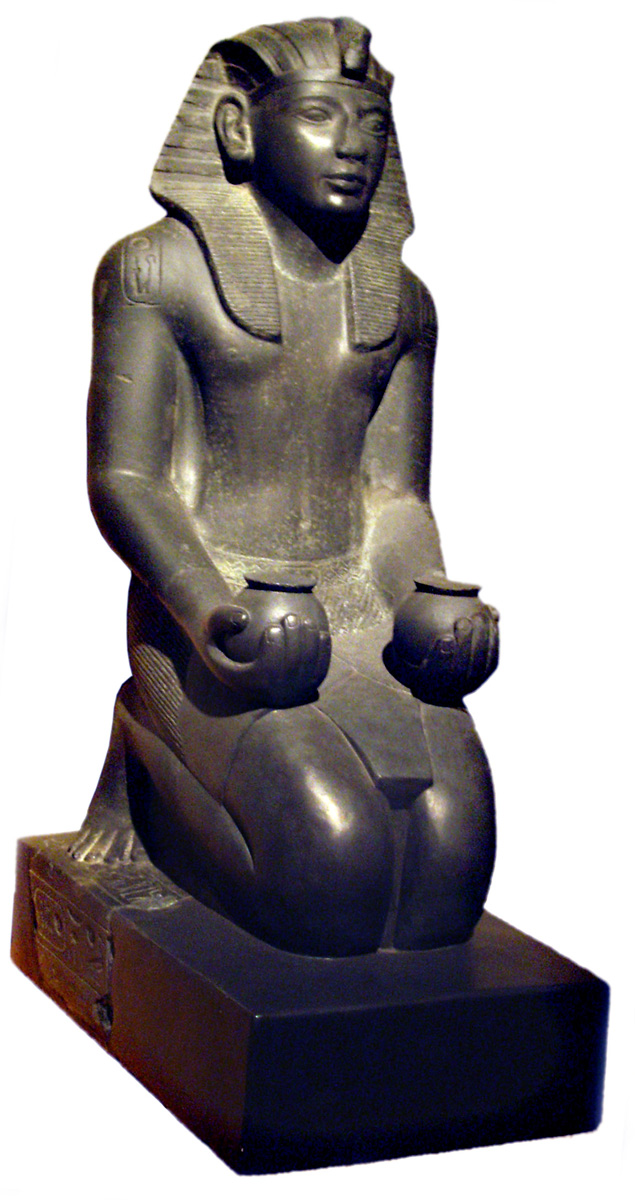
- Ramesses IV offering two Nu vases, British Museum.

Pharaoh
- Reign: 1154–1148 BC
- Predecessor: Ramesses III
- Successor: Ramesses V
Royal titulary
Horus name
Horus Kanekhet Ankhemmaat Nebkhabused mi Itef Ptah Tatenen
K3-nḫt-ˁnḫ-m-m3ˁ.t-nb-ḥ3bw-sd-mj-jt.f-Ptḥ-T3-ṯnn
Horus, the strong bull, his Maat lives, master of the Heb-Sed like his father Ptah-Tatenen
G5	E2 D43 S34 G17 H6 V30 O23 Z3 W19 M17 X1 I9 Z1 I9 Q3 X1 V28 A52
Nebty name
Mekemetwaf Pedjut-9
Mk-kmt-wˁf-pḏwt-9
The protector of Egypt, he who vanquishes the 9 bows (the enemies of Egypt)
G16	Aa11 D36 V31 I6 Aa15 X1 O49 G45 V1 D40 T10 X1 Z3 Z3 Z3
Golden Horus
Wser Renput Wer Nekhetu
Wsr-rnpwt-wr-nḫtw
The golden falcon, rich in years, whose victories are great
G8	F12 S29 M4 M4 M4 G36 D21 N35 M3 Aa1 X1 D43 Z2
Prenomen
Usermaatre Heqamaatre Setepenamun
Wsr-m3ˁ.t-Rˁ-stp.n-Jmn
Rich in Maat like Ra, the chosen one of Amun
M23 t L2 t < N5 F12 H6 C12 U21 S3 >
After the second year
Heqamaatre Setepenamun
Ḥq3-m3ˁ.t-Rˁ-stp.n-Jmn
Ruler of the Maat like Ra, the chosen one of Amun
M23 t L2 t < N5 S38 H6 U21 N35 M17 Y5 N35 G7 >
Nomen
Ramesisu Heqamaat Meriamun
Rˁ-msj-sw-ḥq3-m3ˁt-mrj-Jmn
Ra has fashioned him, ruler of the Maat, beloved of Amun

G39 N5	U6 C12 C2 F31 O34 O34 N5 S38 C10
- Consort: Duatentopet (half-sister)
- Children: Ramesses V
- Father: Ramesses III
- Mother: Tyti
- Born: 1175 BC
- Died: 1148 BC (aged 27)
- Burial: KV2; Mummy found in the KV35 royal cache (Theban Necropolis)
- Monuments: Temple of Khonsu at Karnak
- Dynasty: Twentieth Dynasty of Egypt

Usermaatre Heqamaatre Setepenamun Ramesses IV (also written Ramses or Rameses) was the third pharaoh of the Twentieth Dynasty of the New Kingdom of Ancient Egypt. He was the second son of Ramesses III and became crown prince when his elder brother Amenherkhepshef died aged 15 in 1164 BC, when Ramesses was only 12 years old. His promotion to crown prince is suggested by his appearance (suitably entitled) in a scene of the festival of Min at the Ramesses III temple at Karnak, which may have been completed by Year 22 [of his father's reign]. (the date is mentioned in the poem inscribed there)

As his father's chosen successor, the prince employed three distinctive titles: "Hereditary Prince", "Royal scribe" and "Generalissimo." The latter two titles are mentioned in a text at the temple of Amenhotep III at Soleb and all three titles appear on a lintel now in Florence, Italy. As heir-apparent he took on increasing responsibilities; for instance, in Year 27 of his father's reign, he is depicted appointing a certain Amenemope to the important position of Third Prophet of Amun in the latter's TT 148 tomb. Amenemope's Theban tomb also accords prince Ramesses all three of his aforementioned sets of royal titles. Despite the 31-year reign of his father Ramesses III, Ramesses IV was only 21 when he became pharaoh, and only reigned for six and a half years. His rule has been dated to 1155 to 1149 BC.

== Family ==
It is now believed that Ramesses IV's mother was most likely Queen Tyti from recently discovered notes published in the 2010 issue of the Journal of Egyptian Archaeology. They reveal that Tyti—who was a king's daughter, a king's wife and a king's mother in her own right—was identified in Papyrus BM EA 10052 (i.e., the tomb-robbery papyri) to be a queen of Ramesses III, Ramesses IV's father. The 2010 JEA article authors—including Aidan Dodson—write that since Ramesses VI's mother is known to be a certain lady named Iset Ta-Hemdjert or Isis:

only Ramesses IV and Ramesses VIII remain as candidates [for the son of Tyti]. Given that Ramesses VIII only reigned briefly some 25 years after his father's death, it is hardly likely that the decoration of QV52, with the mwt-nsw (i.e., king's mother) title intimately mixed with Tyti's other titles, could have been delayed this late to refer to him. This leaves Ramesses IV as the only credible primary 'subject' of the mwt-nsw title in the tomb. As for which--if any--of the other sons of Ramesses III were borne to Tyti, no unequivocal data is available, other than the fact that Amenhirkhopeshef B, buried in QV55, was ms n Hmt-nTr mwt-nTr Hmt-nsw-wrt, paralleling Tyti's titles so closely that he may with some confidence be proposed as her son.

Thus, the identity of Ramesses IV's mother has been resolved in favour of Queen Tyti who was once erroneously thought to be the mother of another king in the mid-1980s: Ramesses XI. Ramesses IV was succeeded to the throne by his 13-year-old son Ramesses V.

== Ascension to the throne ==
Fragment of the "Journal of the Necropolis" concerning the change of reign Ramesses III to Ramesses IV. Museo Egizio, Turin.

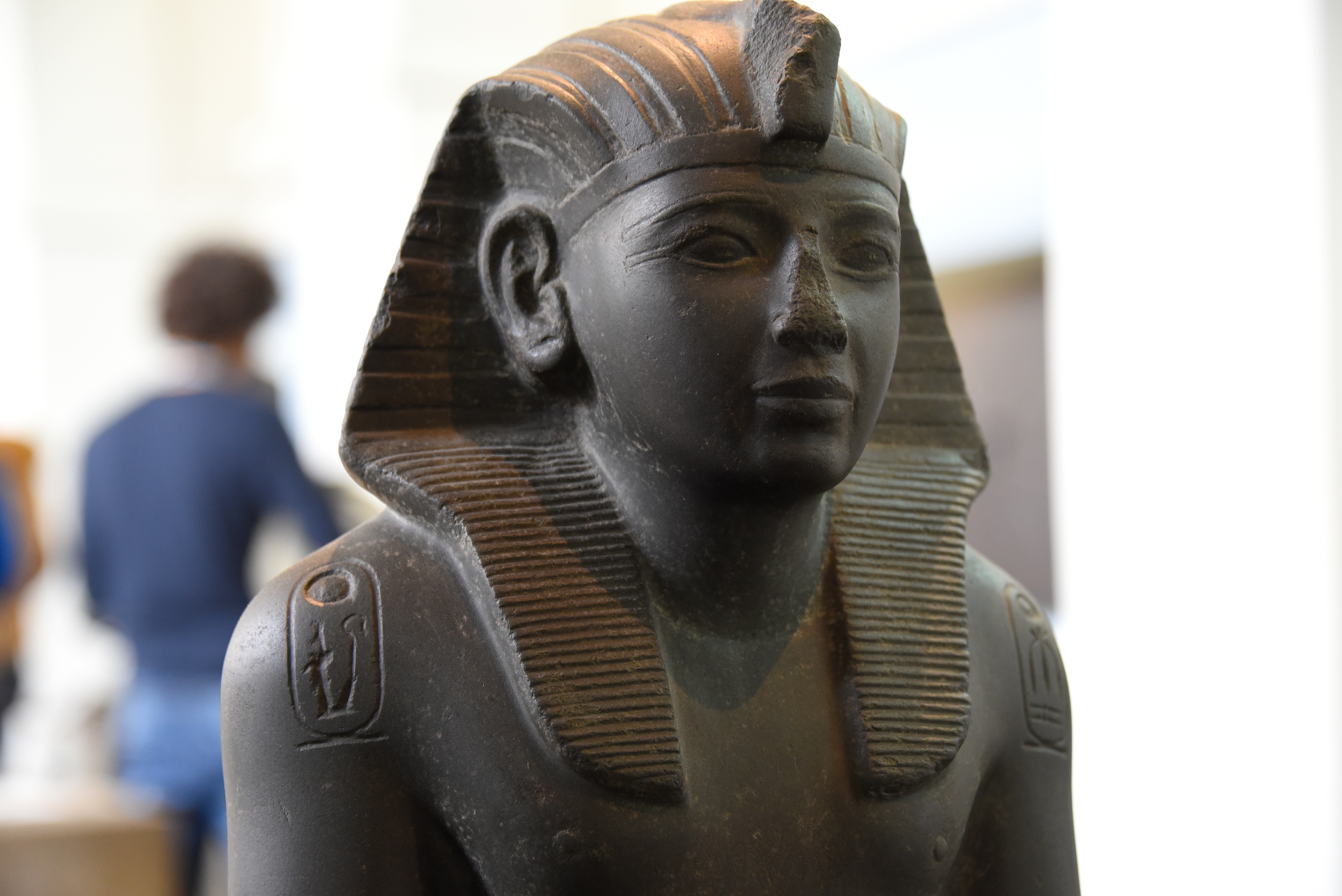
Statue of Ramesses IV, nomen and prenomen cartouches on shoulders, currently housed in the British Museum

Ramesses IV came to the throne in difficult circumstances. Ramesses III, his father, was assassinated by conspirators led by Tiye, one of his secondary wives, to establish Pentawer, her own son and Ramesses IV's half-brother, on the throne. Ramesses IV, however, was able to secure himself on the throne. It is possible that other members of the royal family loyal to him reacted quickly to outmaneuver the conspirators and Tiye to ensure Ramesses' rightful spot on the throne. Afterwards, he had the conspirators arrested, prosecuted and executed.

It was once thought that Ramesses IV's father, Ramesses III, had survived the initial attack, only to die some time later. This is due in part to the Judicial Papyrus of Turin, which preserves a record of the trials of the conspirators, being carried out under his name. The document opens with:

[King Usermare'-Meriamun, l.p.h., Son of Re': Ramesses] Ruler of Heliopolis [l.p.h. said]... I commissioned the overseer of the treasury Montemtowe; the overseer of the treasury Pefrowe; the standard-bearer Kara; the butler Paibese, the butler Kedendenna; the butler Ba'almahar; the butler Peirswene; the butler Dhutrekhnefer; the king's adjutant Penernute; the clerk Mai; the clerk of the archives Pre'em-hab; the standard-bearer of the infantry Hori; saying 'As for the matters which the people-I do not know who-have plotted, go and examine them'.

After giving the instructions to the judges, he then reports the following outcomes:

And they went and examined them, and they caused to die by their own hands those whom they caused (so) to die, though [I] do not know [wh]o, [and they] also punished [the] others, though I do not know who. But [I] had charged [them strictly], saying: 'Take heed, have a care lest you allow that [somebody] be punished (9) wrongfully [by an official] who is not over him'.

His mummy appeared to show no outward signs of any injuries and his death was presumed to be a natural one. However, recent CT scanning of his mummy reveals that his throat was cut to the bone, severing the trachea, esophagus, and blood vessels, which would be rapidly fatal. This finding confirms the theory that Ramesses IV carried out the trial and execution of the conspirators in the name of his slain father, rather than by Ramesses III himself.

=== Avenging his father ===
Ramesses IV, having secured his succession, convened a tribunal of twelve judges to prosecute the conspirators. This commission included two treasury chiefs, Montouemtaouy and Payefraouy; a senior courtier, the flabellum bearer Kar, five cupbearers, Paybaset, Qédenden, Baâlmaher, Pairousounou, and Djéhoutyrekhnéfer; the royal herald Penrennout, two scribes from the dispatch office, Mây and Parâemheb; and the army standard-bearer Hori. Three members of the commission were later discovered to have been bribed during by General Payis and were also prosecuted. Paybaset was replaced by the cupbearer Méroutousyimen, while the replacements for Mây and Hori remain unknown. The accused, all referred to as "great enemies," were brought before the "investigation office" and questioned. They quickly confessed to their involvement in the conspiracy.

Approximately thirty individuals were found guilty, both for their direct involvement and for complicity. Twenty-two were executed, and eleven—including Prince Pentawer—were allowed or compelled to commit suicide. The conspiracy also reflected a broader erosion of central authority. The plot also implicated high-ranking harem officials who were charged with the pharaoh's personal security. These included Panik, director of the king's chamber, and his deputy Pendouaou, scribe of the same office. Additionally, several administrative officials were convicted of failing to report the conspiracy and were punished. During the trial, three judges and two police officers were found to have accepted bribes—allegedly in the form of promises of illicit harem gatherings—and were punished by the mutilation of their noses and ears. Paybaset, one of the accused judges, committed suicide following this public punishment.

The fate of Queen Tiye and the other women of the harem who were involved in the conspiracy remains unclear, as available sources provide no further details regarding their outcomes.

== Projects ==
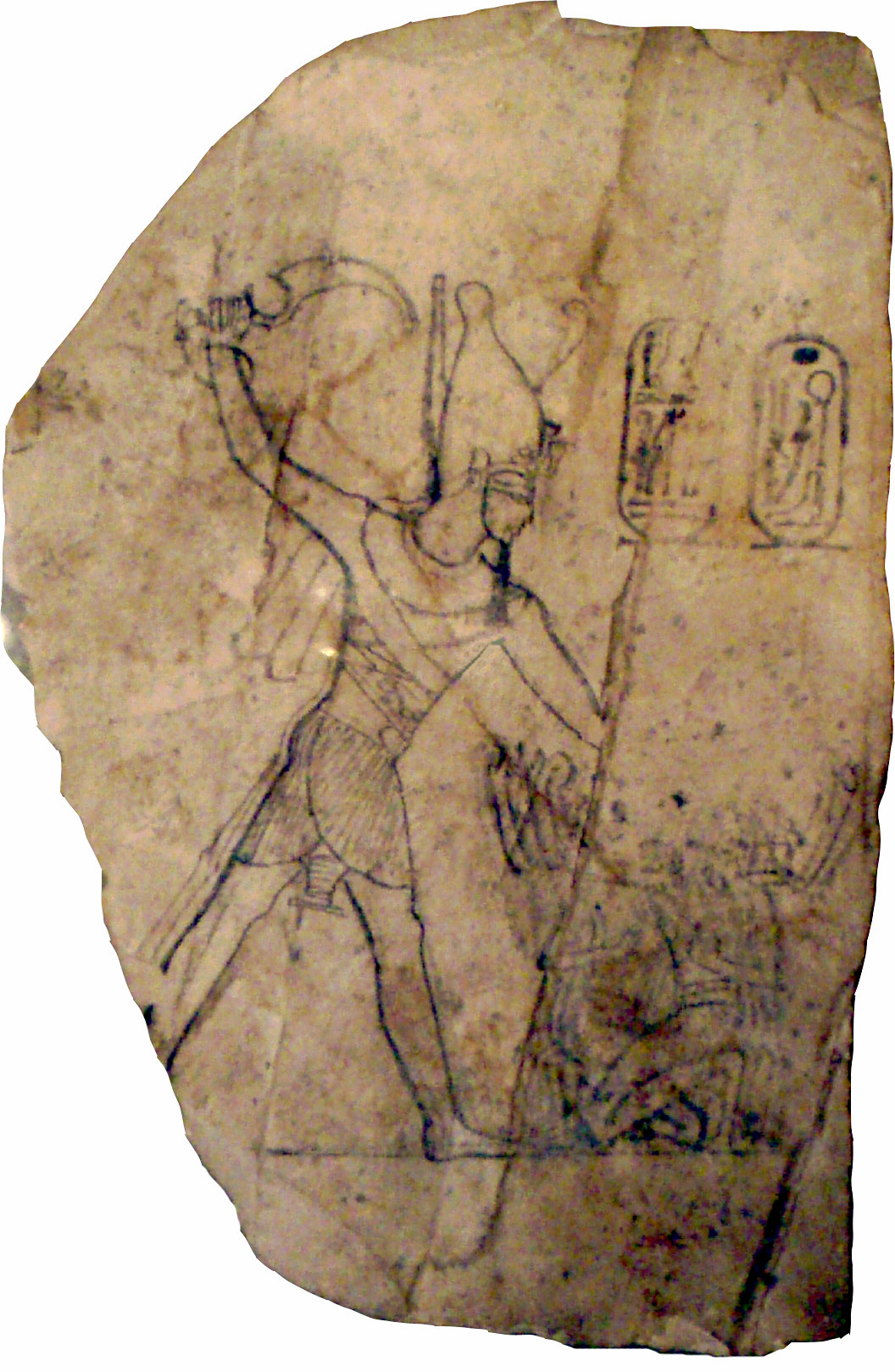
Limestone ostracon depicting Ramesses IV smiting his enemies.

At the start of his reign, the pharaoh initiated a substantial building program on the scale of Ramesses II by doubling the size of the work gangs at Deir el-Medina to a total of 120 men and dispatching numerous expeditions to the stone quarries of Wadi Hammamat and the turquoise mines of the Sinai. The Great Rock stela of Ramesses IV at Wadi Hammamat records that the largest expedition—dated to his Year 3, third month of Shemu day 27—consisted of 8,368 men alone including 5,000 soldiers, 2,000 personnel of the Amun temples, 800 Apiru and 130 stonemasons and quarrymen under the personal command of the High Priest of Amun, Ramessesnakht. The scribes who composed the text also noted that this figure included 900 men "who are dead and omitted from this list." Consequently, once this omitted figure is included to the tally of 8,368 men who served in the Year 3 quarry expedition, a total of 900 men out of an original expedition of 8,368 men perished during this endeavour for a mortality rate of 10.7%. Some of the stones which were dragged 60 miles to the Nile from Wadi Hammamat weighed 40 tons or more. Other Egyptian quarries including Aswan were located much closer to the Nile which enabled them to use barges to transport stones long distances.

Part of the king's program included the extensive enlargement of his father's Temple of Khonsu at Karnak and the construction of a large mortuary temple near the Temple of Hatshepsut. Ramesses IV also sent several expeditions to the turquoise mines in the Sinai; a total of four expeditions are known prior to his fourth year. The Serabit el-Khadim stela of the Royal Butler Sobekhotep states: "Year 3, third month of Shemu. His Majesty sent his favoured and beloved one, the confident of his lord, the Overseer of the Treasury of Silver and Gold, Chief of the Secrets of the august Palace, Sobekhotep, justified, to bring for him all that his heart desired of turquoise (on) his fourth expedition." This expedition dates to either Ramesses III or IV's reign since Sobekhotep is attested in office until at least the reign of Ramesses V. Ramesses IV's final venture to the turquoise mines of the Sinai is documented by the stela of a senior army scribe named Panufer. Panufer states that this expedition's mission was both to procure turquoise and to establish a cult chapel of king Ramesses IV at the Hathor temple of Serabit el-Khadim. The stela reads:

Year 5, second month of Shomu [i.e., summer]. The sending by His Majesty <to> build the Mansion of Millions of Years of Ramesses IV in the temple of Hathor, Lady of Turquoise, by Panefer, the Scribe of the Commands of the Army, son of Pairy, justified.

While little is known regarding the route that the mining missions took from Egypt to Serabit el-Khadim, A. J. Peden, who wrote a biography of Ramesses IV in 1994, states that there were "two obvious routes" to reach this site:

The first was a straightforward march from a Delta base, such as Memphis, east south-east and then south into Sinai. Surviving a march in this inhospitable land would have presented formidable logistical obstacles, perhaps forcing an alternative route to be adopted. This would involve a departure from the Delta to a site near the modern port of Suez. From here they could have proceeded by boat to the ports of Abu Zenima or El-Markha on the west coast of the Sinai peninsula and from there it is a short journey inland of only a day or two to the actual site of Serabit el-Khadim.

== Attestations ==
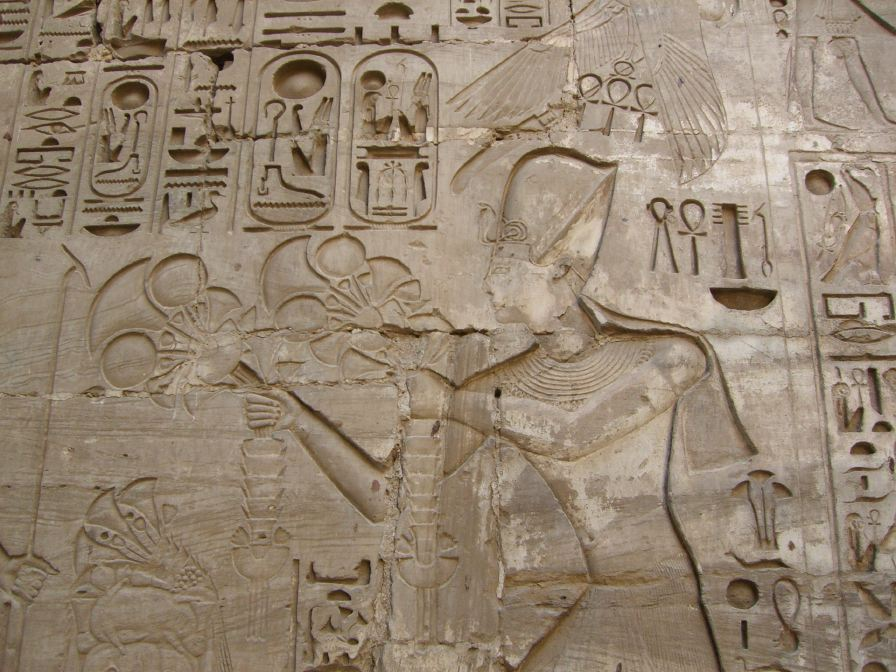
Relief of Ramesses IV at the Temple of Khonsu in Karnak

Ramesses IV is attested by his aforementioned building activity at Wadi Hammamat and Serabit el-Khadim in the Sinai as well as several papyri and even one obelisk. The creation of a royal cult in the Temple of Hathor is known under his reign at Serabit el-Khadim while Papyrus Mallet (or P. Louvre 1050) dates to Years 3 and 4 of his reign. Papyrus Mallet is a six column text dealing partly with agricultural affairs; its first column lists the prices for various commodities between Year 31 of Ramesses III until Year 3 of Ramesses IV. The final four columns contain a memorandum of 2 letters composed by the Superintendent of Cattle of the Estate of Amen-Re, Bakenkhons, to several mid-level administrators and their subordinates. Meanwhile, surviving monuments of Ramesses IV in the Delta consists of an obelisk recovered in Cairo and a pair of his cartouches found on a pylon gateway both originally from Heliopolis.

The most important document to survive from this pharaoh's rule is Papyrus Harris I, which honours the life of his father, Ramesses III, by listing the latter's many accomplishments and gifts to the temples of Egypt, and the Turin papyrus, the earliest known geological map. Ramesses IV was perhaps the last New Kingdom king to engage in large-scale monumental building after his father as "there was a marked decline in temple building even during the longer reigns of Ramesses IX and VI. The only apparent exception was the attempt of Ramesses V and VI to continue the vast and uncompleted mortuary temple of Ramesses IV at the Assasif."

=== Levant ===
At Beirut, a 12th-century burial shaft included a bone amulet with the cartouche of Ramesses IV.

== Death ==
Despite Ramesses IV's many endeavours for the gods and his prayer to Osiris—preserved on a Year 4 stela at Abydos—that "thou shalt give me the great age with a long reign [as my predecessor]", the king did not live long enough to accomplish his ambitious goals. Ramesses IV's highest known date in the archaeological records is a Year 7, III Akhet day 23 ostracon which, under the Egyptian dating system, meant that this ruler had a reign of just more than 6 full years.

After a short reign of about six and a half years, Ramesses IV died and was buried in tomb KV2 in the Valley of the Kings. His mummy was found in the royal cache of Amenhotep II's tomb KV35 in 1898. His chief wife is Queen Duatentopet or Tentopet or who was buried in QV74. His son, Ramesses V, would succeed him to the throne.

Originally, Ramesses IV had a tomb built for him in the Valley of the Queens, QV53.

In April 2021 his mummy was moved from the Museum of Egyptian Antiquities to the National Museum of Egyptian Civilization along with those of 17 other kings and 4 queens in an event termed the Pharaohs' Golden Parade.

== Gallery ==
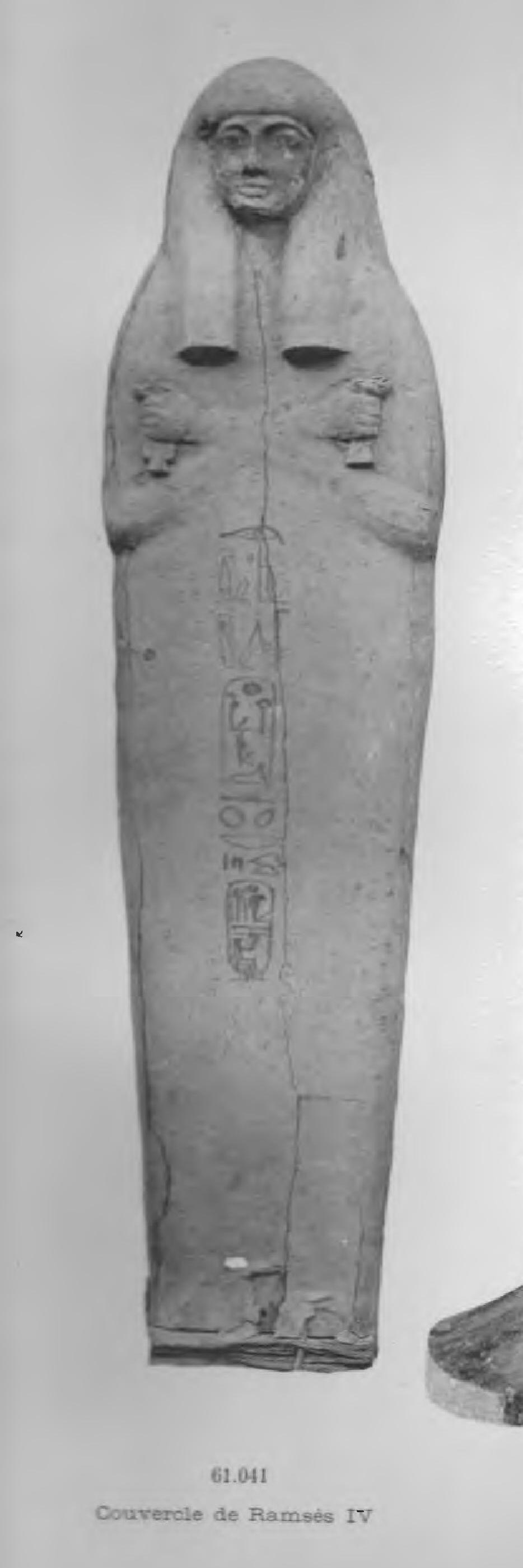
Coffin of Ramesses IV

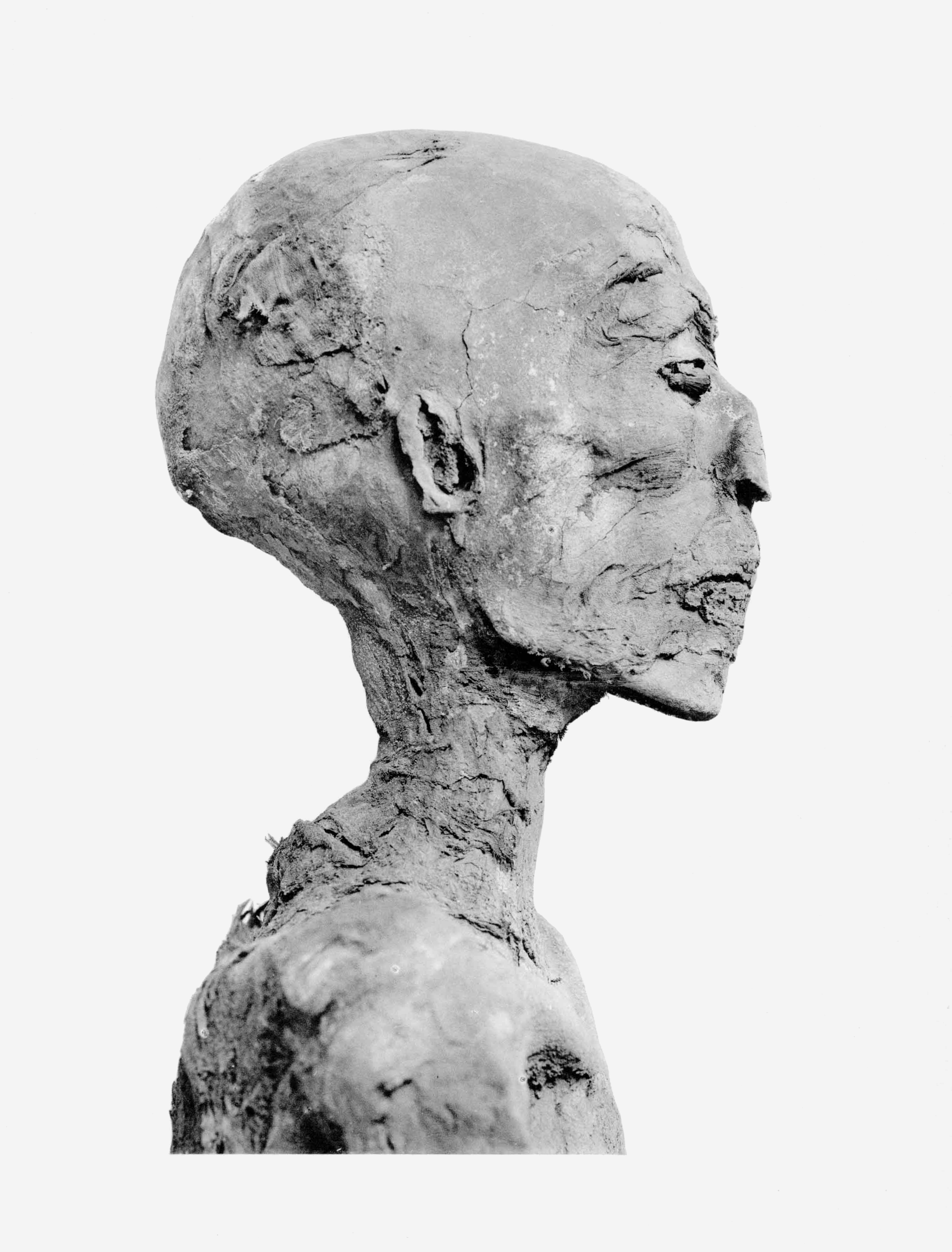
Ramesses IV's mummy

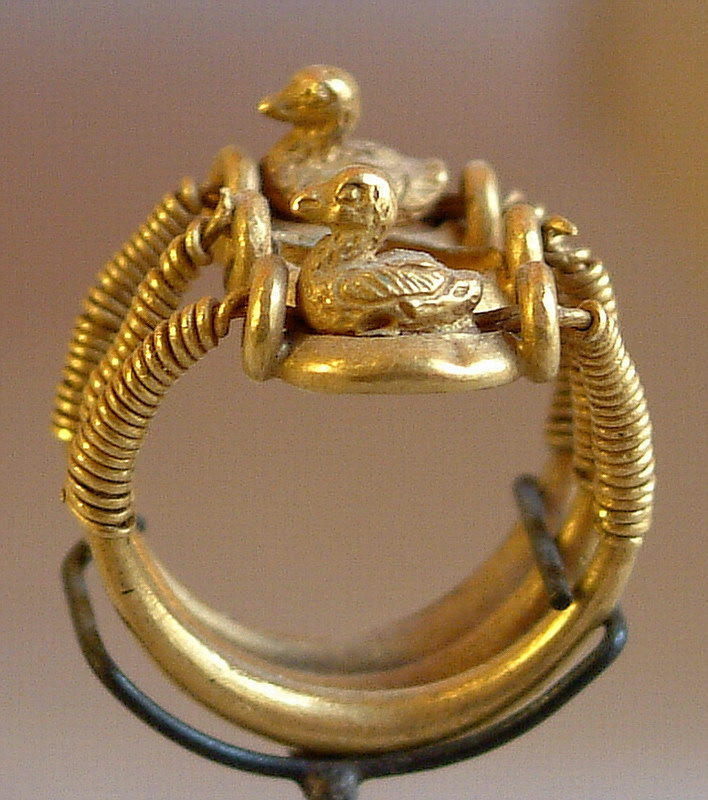
Ring featuring ducks with Ramesses IV's name

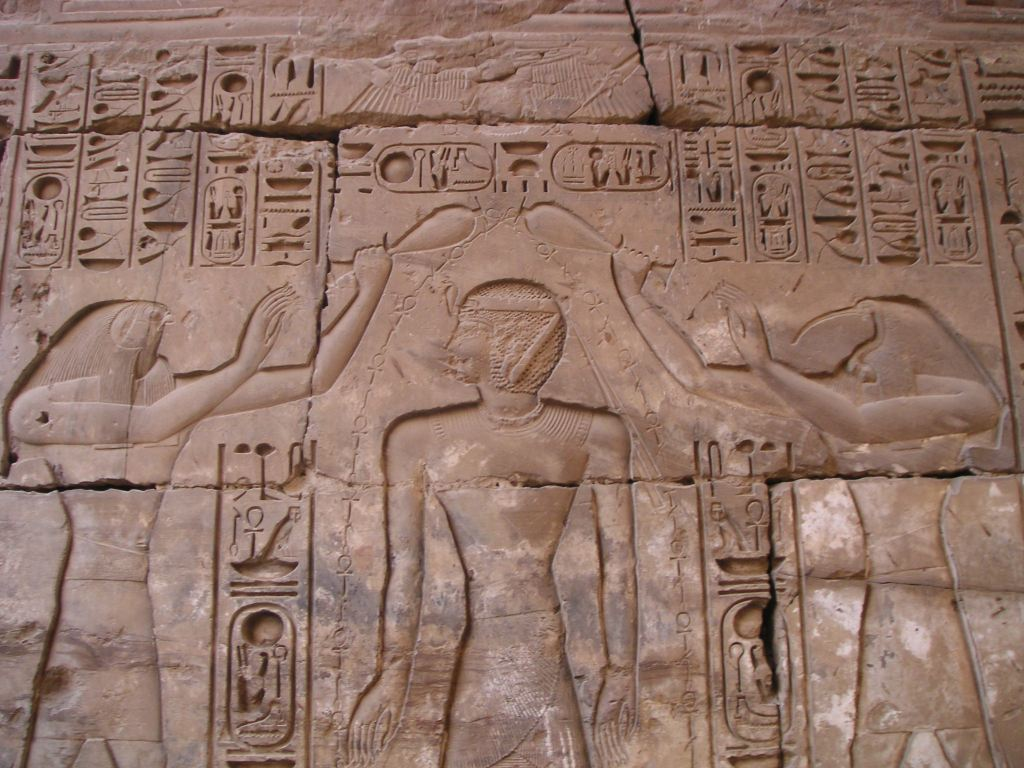
Relief of Ramesses IV at the Temple of Khonsu

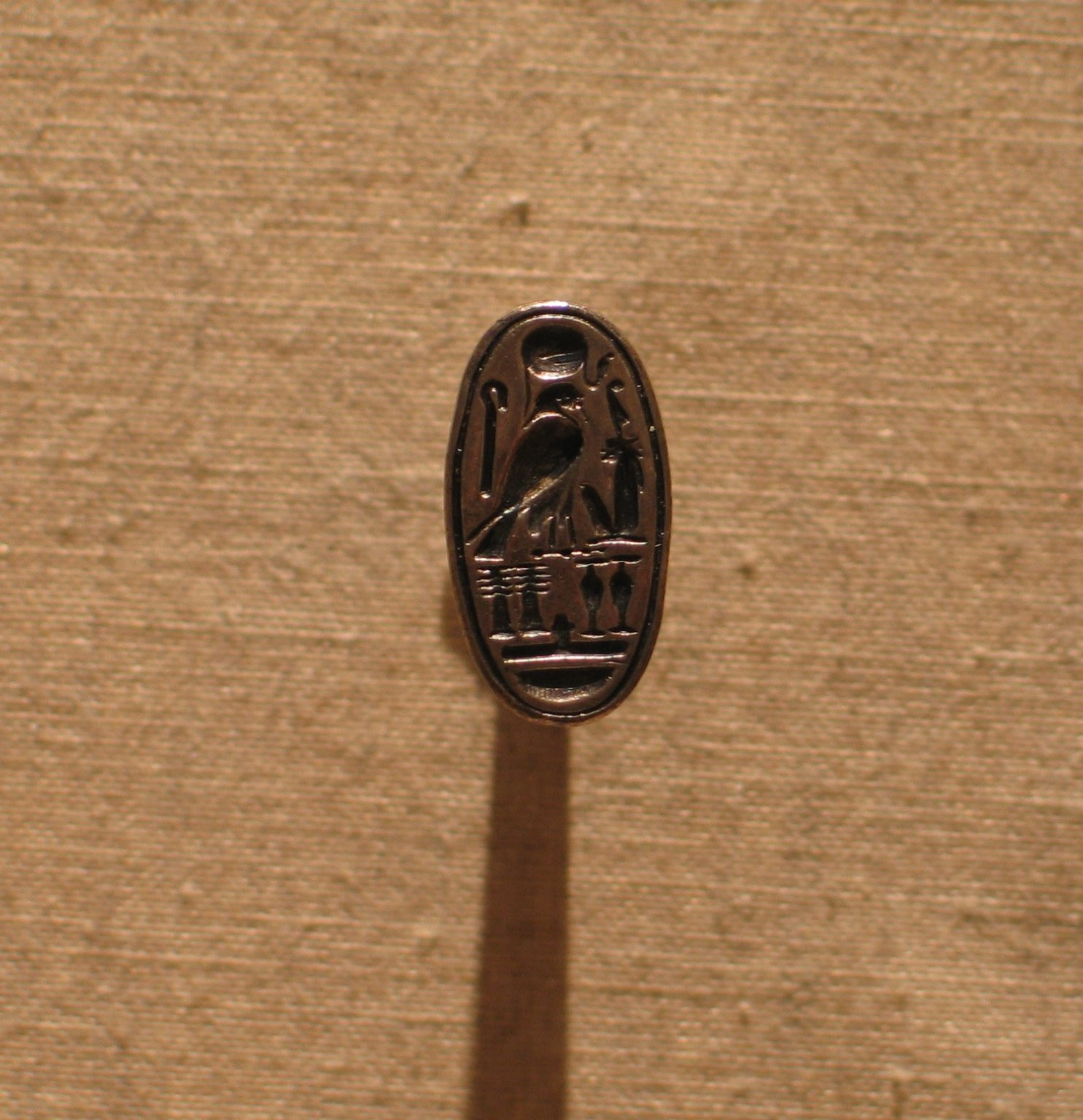
Silver ring of Ramesses IV at the Brooklyn Museum

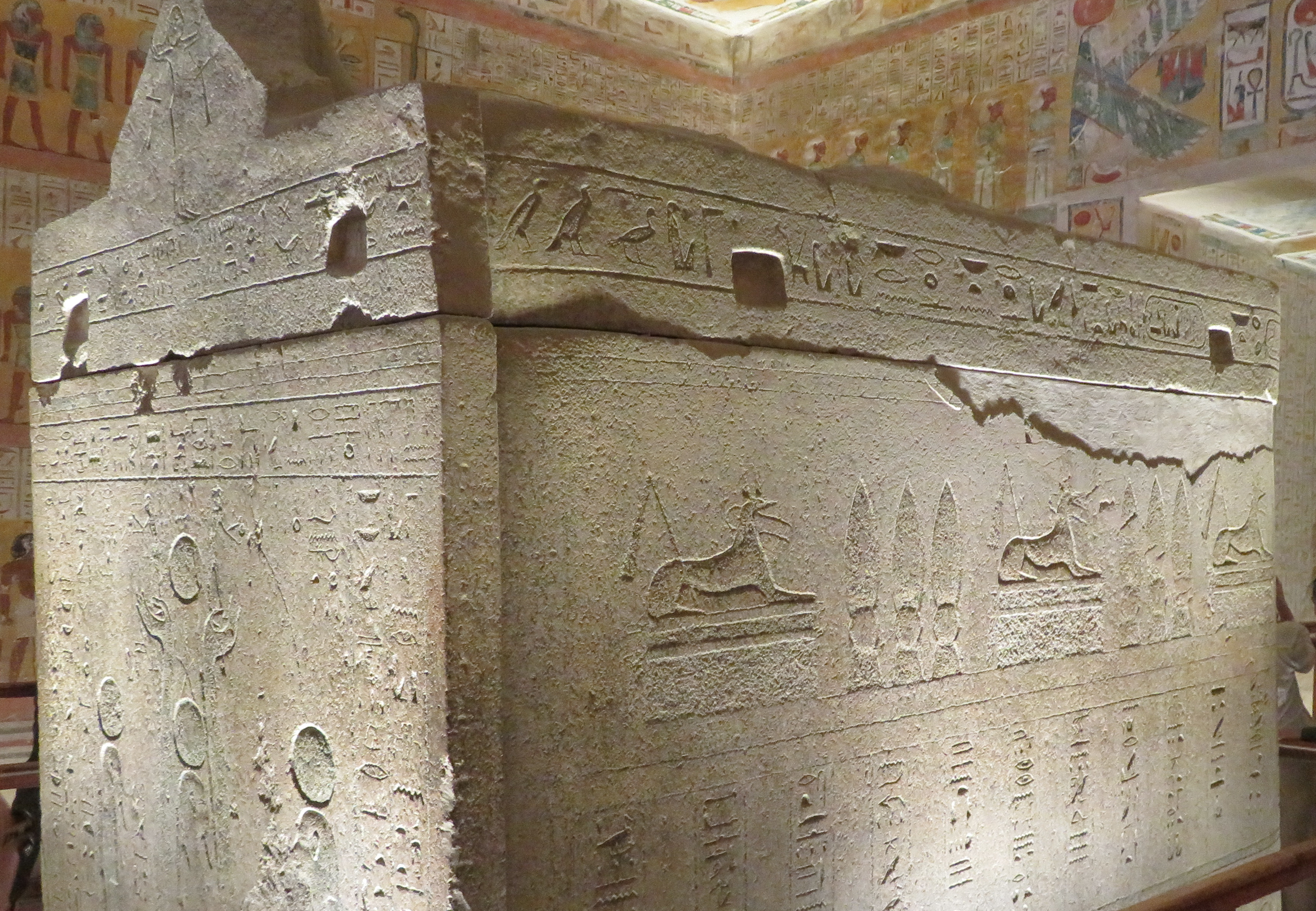
The stone sarcophagus of Ramesses IV in tomb KV2
