= Savana News =

Weekly newspaper in Mozambique

Savana is a leading independent weekly newspaper in Mozambique. It is based in Maputo, written in the Portuguese language, and published by Mediacoop.

Mediacoop also publishes mediaFAX.
