= Tavio Amorin =

Togolese politician (1958–1992)

- Tavio Ayao Tobias Amorin
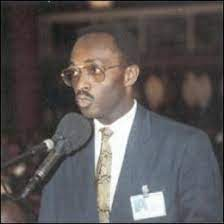

Personal details
- Born: 20 November 1958 Togo, Lomé
- Died: 29 July 1992 (aged 33) Paris
- Resting place: Lomé

Tavio Ayao Tobias Amorin (20 November 1958 – 29 July 1992) was a Togolese socialist politician. He led the Pan-African Socialist Party, the ideology of which was influenced by such figures as Marcus Garvey, Kwame Nkrumah and Cheikh Anta Diop.

Amorin was born in Lomé. He was a member of the High Council of the Republic, formed in 1991 as the transitional legislature, and eventually became President of political and human rights affairs. He was also Permanent Secretary of the Coordination of the democratic opposition in Togo (CODII in French).

Being an outspoken opponent to President Gnassingbe Eyadema's dictatorial regime, Amorin was shot in the streets of Lomé by two unidentified men believed to be security force agents on July 23, 1992. First taken to a hospital in town, he was then evacuated in a critical state to a Paris hospital. He died in Paris a few days later on July 29. He was 33 years old.

== Early life and career ==
Born November 20, 1958, in Lomé, Tavio Ayao Tobias Amorin was educated at the Catholic School of Koketime primary and secondary at the College Saint - Joseph in Lomé, sanctioned by a science graduate in 1977. Left for France, he obtained a DEUG in Sciences before moving on to the computer. He specialized in industrial systems at the University of Orsay.

After having been a business consultant in France, Tavio Amorin moved to the Ivory Coast. Through general amnesty in 1991, the leader returned to Togo to take part in democratic renewal. He started by setting up the Pan-African Socialist (PSP) party with Jean - Claude Edoh Ayanou, Wakilou Maurice Gligli, and Francis Agbagli.

== Death ==
On Thursday, July 23, 1992, at Tokoin - Gbonvie, a district of Lomé, capital Togo, he was assaulted by Togolese Police and succumbed to his injuries in a Paris hospital on July 29, 1992. He was buried in the cemetery of the beach in Lomé. No action was ever taken against the killers.
