= Nyimpine Chissano =

Mozambican businessman and president's son

- Born: 17 March 1970; Portuguese Mozambique (present-day Mozambique)
- Died: 19 November 2007 (aged 37)
- Father: Joaquim Chissano

Nyimpine Chissano (17 March 1970 – 19 November 2007) was the eldest son of former Mozambican president Joaquim Chissano. A Maputo-based businessman, he had been linked to two high-profile murders in Mozambique, both of which are widely reported to have occurred because of their victims' anti-corruption activities.

== Carlos Cardoso ==
Chissano was called as a witness in the 2002 trial of the murderers of Cardoso, and was said by a witness to have arranged the payment of US$46,000 to the killers.

== Austral Bank ==
On 9 September 2006 the Mozambican News Agency (AIM) reported that the weekly Maputo newspaper Savana had published the 1998 contract between the privatised Austral Bank and Nyimpine Chissano, under which Chissano was to be paid US$3,000 a month for consultancy work. In the 2002 Cardoso trial, Nyimpine Chissano denied any contacts with Austral Bank.

== Antonio Siba-Siba Macuacua ==
In April 2001, Austral Bank became insolvent and was taken over by the Bank of Mozambique. The Bank of Mozambique appointed an interim board of directors, led by the head of its banking supervision department, Antonio Siba-Siba Macuacua. One of Siba-Siba's first actions was to cancel contracts which he considered irrelevant to the bank's interests, and on 26 April 2001 he cancelled Austral's contract with Chissano.

On 11 August 2001, Siba-Siba was murdered at Austral's Maputo headquarters; his killers have never been positively identified, but press reports in Mozambique have identified a former member of Joaquim Chissano's Presidential Guard as the murderer.

== Murder charges ==
On 11 May 2006, AIM reported that the Mozambican public prosecutor's office had charged Nyimpine Chissano of "joint moral authorship" of the murder of Carlos Cardoso. AIM also quoted a report in the Mozambican journal Zambeze that a Maputo prosecutor, Fernando Canana, had issued an arrest warrant for Nyimpine Chissano which was subsequently suspended because of the intervention of Chissano's parents, former president Chissano and his wife.

== Death ==
Chissano was found dead at his home in Maputo on 19 November 2007. State radio reported that the cause of death had not been determined, but stated that Chissano had been suffering from an illness for some time.
