= Tiye (20th dynasty) =

- Queen consort of Egypt
- Spouse: Pharaoh Ramesses III
- Issue: Pentawer
- Dynasty: 20th Dynasty of Egypt
- Religion: Ancient Egyptian religion

U33 i i Z4 B1
Tije
in hieroglyphs
Era: New Kingdom
(1550–1069 BC)

Tiye was an ancient Egyptian queen of the Twentieth Dynasty; a secondary wife of Ramesses III, against whom she instigated a coup, known as the Harem conspiracy.

Tiye is known from the Judicial Papyrus of Turin, which recorded that there was a harem conspiracy against Ramesses, in which several people in high positions in the pharaoh's government were involved. The conspirators wanted to kill the king and place Tiye's son Pentawer on the throne, instead of the appointed heir, the son of Tyti, one of the king's two chief wives.

Ramesses was attacked by multiple assailants, one slitting his throat, another removing his big toe with a heavy sword or axe. However, his designated heir was able to control the situation, and succeeded him as Ramesses IV. The conspirators were caught, brought to trial, and condemned. Several were executed or mutilated. Others, including Pentawer, were compelled to commit suicide. It is not known what happened to Tiye.
