= Pentawer =

Ancient Egyptian Prince of the 20th dynasty, son of Ramesses III and Tiye

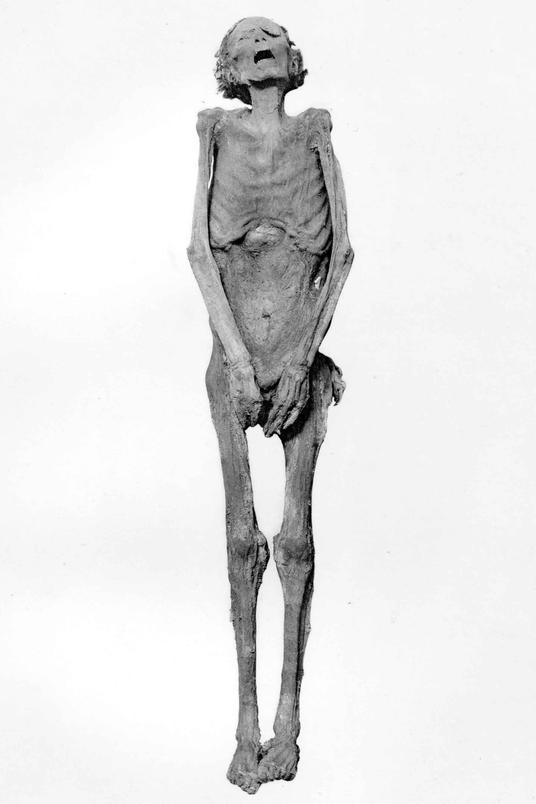
- Mummy of the "Unknown Man E", likely identified as Pentawer
- Born: c. 1173 BC; Thebes
- Died: 1155 BC
- Burial: Unknown, possible mummy found at DB320
- Dynasty: 20th Dynasty of Egypt
- Father: Ramesses III
- Mother: Tiye
- Religion: Ancient Egyptian religion

p n t&A wr r Z5
Pentawer
in hieroglyphs
Era: New Kingdom
(1550–1069 BC)

Pentawer (also Pentawere and Pentaweret) was an ancient Egyptian prince of the 20th Dynasty, a son of Pharaoh Ramesses III and his secondary wife, Tiye. He was involved in the "harem conspiracy," a plot to kill his father and place him on the throne. The details of his trial are recorded in the Judicial Papyrus of Turin; he was compelled to commit suicide following his trial. A candidate for his body is a mummy known as "Unknown Man E", discovered in the Deir el-Bahari cache in 1881. This mummy is unusual as it was found wrapped in a sheep or goat skin and was improperly mummified, being left with all his organs. Bob Brier has suggested that this mummy does indeed belong to the disgraced prince; DNA analysis has confirmed a father-son relationship with Pentawer's known father, Ramesses III, with both sharing the same Y chromosomal haplogroup and half of their DNA.

== Conspiracy ==
The actual name of this prince is unknown, "Pentawer" being a pseudonym given to him on the Judicial Papyrus of Turin. He was to be the beneficiary of the harem conspiracy, probably initiated by his mother Tiye, to assassinate the pharaoh. Tiye wanted her son to succeed the pharaoh, even though the chosen heir was a son of the queen Tyti. According to the Judicial Papyrus, Pentawer was among those who were made to stand trial for their participation in the conspiracy. He was forced to kill himself:

Pentawere, to whom had been given that other name. He was brought in because he had been in collusion with Teye, his mother, when she had plotted the matters with the women of the harem concerning the making rebellion against his lord. He was placed before the butlers in order to be examined; they found him guilty; they left him where he was; he took his own life.

James Henry Breasted argued that Pentawer "was in all probability only an unfortunate tool" in the conspiracy. Susan Redford speculates that Pentawer, being a noble, was given the option to kill himself by taking poison and so be spared the humiliating fate of some of the other conspirators who were executed. If the means of execution was burning as Redford proposes — the related papyri themselves do not indicate the method of execution - this would have served to make a strong example since it emphasized the gravity of their treason for ancient Egyptians who believed that one could only attain an afterlife if one's body was mummified and preserved — rather than being destroyed by fire. By killing himself, Pentawer could avoid the harsher punishment of a second death. This could have permitted him to be mummified and move on to the afterlife. A recent study of the remains of "Unknown Man E" which are a candidate for his suggest that he died by strangulation or hanging. If the remains indeed are his, then he would have been about 18-20 years old at the time of his death.

== Probable mummy ==
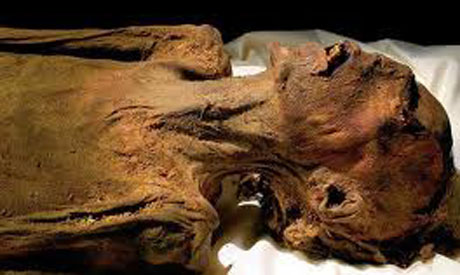
Mummy of "Unknown Man E" in 2011.

In recent times, the Egyptologist Bob Brier has revived the old hypothesis that the famed mummy of the "Unknown Man E" found in the Deir el-Bahari cache (DB320) might, indeed, be Pentawer. The mummy is very unusual because it appears to have been embalmed quickly, without removing the brain and viscera, and to have been placed in a cedar box, the interior of which had to be crudely hacked to widen it. Brier hypothesizes that Pentawer was mummified very rapidly and placed in an available coffin, likely by a relative, in order to give him a proper burial.

Subsequent DNA analysis supports the theory that the mummy was a son of Ramesses III, as genetic testing demonstrated a father–son relationship and identical Y-chromosomal STR profiles indicating a shared paternal lineage, although no specific Y-DNA haplogroup was identified. If the mummy indeed is Pentawer, then he was probably originally buried in Ramesses III's tomb of KV11, which may explain why the mummy was included in the Deir el-Bahari Cache, as the Third Intermediate Period saw the priests of Amun remove royal mummies from their tombs and place them into caches.
