= Assassination campaign =

An assassination campaign is a series of assassinations carried out to achieve a larger political goal.

== History ==
In the 19th century, Narodnaya Volya carried out a campaign of assassinations against high-ranking Russian leaders.

In India, during the Punjab Insurgency militants launched an assassination campaign against the pro-negotiation Akali Dal (L) and Akali Dal (B) members as well as members of the CPI and CPIM. In northern Ireland, an assassination campaign was directed against representatives of the British Army, the RUC, the Ulster Defence Regiment, and their respective reserves. Mossad assassinations following the Munich massacre was an assassination campaign. According to The Washington Post, among Syria's "most notable activities of the past few years have been the serial assassination of senior Lebanese politicians, including former prime minister Rafik Hariri". According to The New York Times, in 2007, Sunni Arab extremists began a systematic campaign to assassinate police chiefs, police officers, other Interior Ministry officials and tribal leaders throughout Iraq, staging at least 10 attacks in 48 hours.

Assassination campaigns also occurred in the North Caucasus. Assassination campaigns have taken place as well in Iran. Operation Condor was another assassination campaign. The Taliban has also been waging an assassination campaign against members of the Afghan central government.

In 2001, U.S. President George W. Bush signed an intelligence finding that could have opened the door to an American targeted killing campaign. In The Impact of 9/11 and the New Legal Landscape: The Day That Changed Everything?, the point is made that "There is a major difference between assassination and targeted killing.... targeted killing [is] not synonymous with assassination. Assassination ... constitutes an illegal killing." Similarly, Amos Guiora, Professor of law at the University of Utah, writes: "Targeted killing is ... not an assassination", Steve David, Johns Hopkins Associate Dean & Professor of International Relations, writes: "there are strong reasons to believe that the Israeli policy of targeted killing is not the same as assassination", Syracuse Law Professor William Banks and GW Law Professor Peter Raven-Hansen write: "Targeted killing of terrorists is ... not unlawful and would not constitute assassination", Rory Miller writes: "Targeted killing ... is not 'assassination'", and Associate Professor Eric Patterson and Teresa Casale write: "Perhaps most important is the legal distinction between targeted killing and assassination". Former CIA operative Sam Wyman believed that method should only be used as a last resort. Barack Obama has ordered unmanned aerial vehicles to carry out targeted killing attacks on Taliban and al Qaeda leaders, which the U.S. distinguishes from assassinations, though this semantic is disputed by his critics.
