= Assassination =

Willful killing of a prominent person

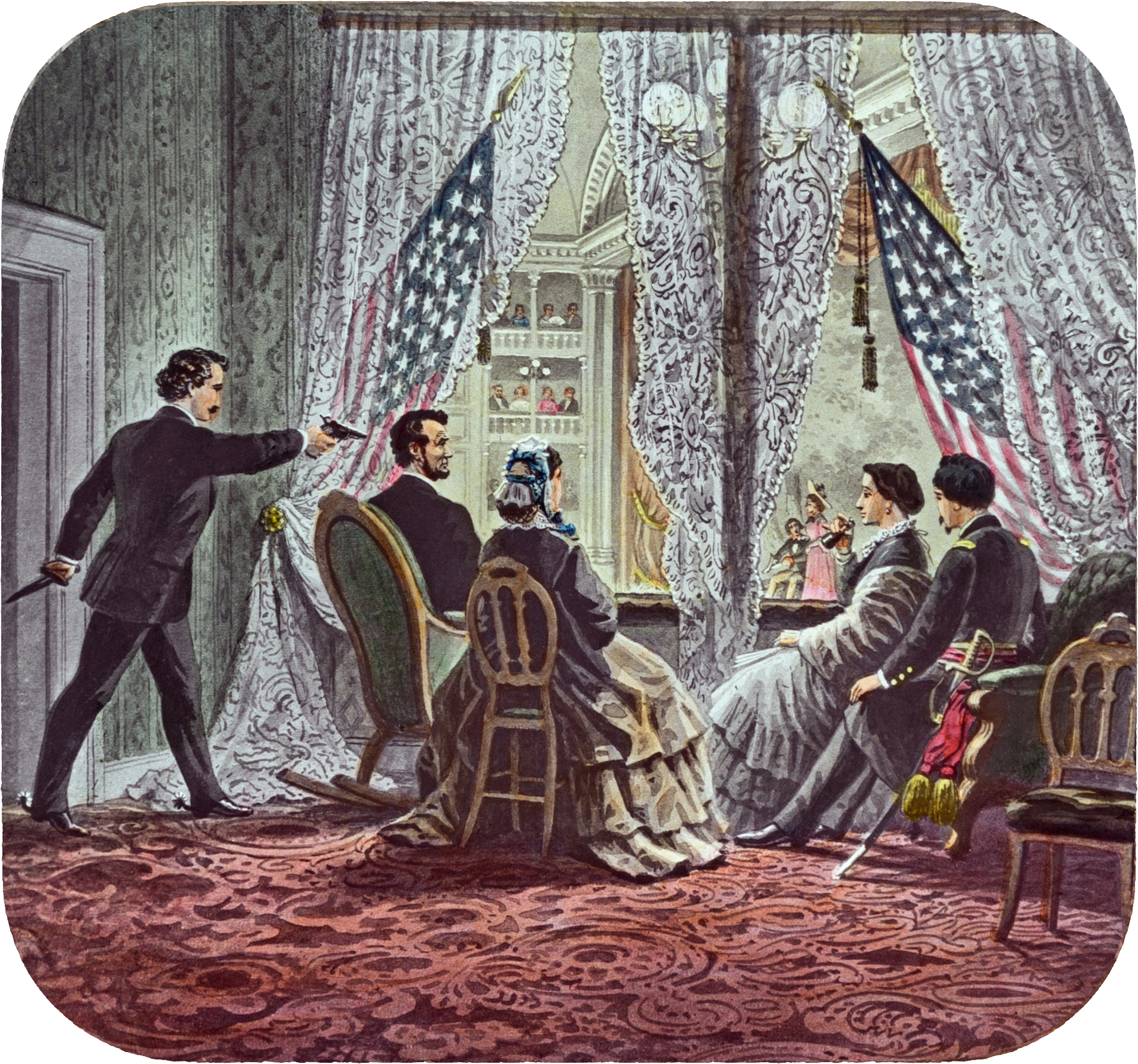
Depiction of the assassination of Abraham Lincoln shown in the presidential booth of Ford's Theatre. From left to right: assassin John Wilkes Booth, Abraham Lincoln, Mary Todd Lincoln, Clara Harris, and Henry Rathbone.

Assassination is the willful killing, by a sudden or secret attack, of a person—especially a prominent or important one—typically for political, social, or ideological reasons. Assassinations may be ordered by individuals or organizations, and carried out by themselves or their hired accomplices. Acts of assassination have been performed since ancient times. A person who carries out an assassination is called an assassin.

== Etymology ==
Assassin comes from medieval Italian and French Assissini or Assassini, believed to derive from the word hashshashin (Arabic: حشّاشين, romanized: ḥaššāšīn), and shares its etymological roots with hashish (/hæˈʃiːʃ/ or /ˈhæʃiːʃ/; from حشيش ḥašīš). It referred to a group of Nizari Ismailis known as the Order of Assassins who worked against various political targets.

Founded by Hassan-i Sabbah, the Assassins were active in the Near East from the 11th to the 13th centuries, beginning with thei revolt. The group killed members of the Abbasid, Seljuk, Fatimid, and Christian Crusader elite for political and religious reasons.

Although it is commonly believed that members of the Order of Assassins were under the influence of hashish during their killings or during their indoctrination, there is debate as to whether these claims have merit, with many Eastern writers and an increasing number of Western academics coming to believe that drug-taking was not the key feature behind the name.

The term "assassinare" (to assassinate) was used in Medieval Latin from the mid 13th century.

The earliest known use of the verb "to assassinate" in printed English was by Matthew Sutcliffe in A Briefe Replie to a Certaine Odious and Slanderous Libel, Lately Published by a Seditious Jesuite, a pamphlet printed in 1600, five years before it was used in Macbeth by William Shakespeare (1605).

== Use in history ==
=== Ancient to medieval times ===
Assassination is one of the oldest tools of power politics. It dates back at least as far as recorded history.

The Egyptian pharaoh Teti, of the Old Kingdom Sixth Dynasty (23rd century BC), is thought to be the earliest known victim of assassination, though written records are scant and thus evidence is circumstantial. Two further ancient Egyptian monarchs are more explicitly recorded to have been assassinated; Amenemhat I of the Middle Kingdom Twelfth Dynasty (20th century BC) is recorded to have been assassinated in his bed by his palace guards for reasons unknown (as related in the Instructions of Amenemhat); meanwhile contemporary judicial records relate the assassination of New Kingdom Twentieth Dynasty monarch Ramesses III in 1155 BC as part of a failed coup attempt. Between 550 BC and 330 BC, seven Persian kings of the Achaemenid Dynasty were murdered. The Art of War, a 5th-century BC Chinese military treatise, mentions tactics of assassination and its merits.

In the Hebrew Bible (Tanakh), King Joash of Judah was assassinated by his own servants; Joab assassinated Absalom, King David's son; King Sennacherib of Assyria was assassinated by his own sons; and Jael assassinated Sisera.

Chanakya (c. 350–283 BC) wrote about assassinations in detail in his political treatise Arthashastra. His student Chandragupta Maurya, the founder of the Maurya Empire, later made use of assassinations against some of his enemies.

Some famous assassination victims are Philip II of Macedon (336 BC), the father of Alexander the Great, and Roman dictator Julius Caesar (44 BC). A number of Roman emperors were assassinated, as did many of the Muslim Shia Imams hundreds of years later. Three successive Rashidun caliphs (Umar, Uthman Ibn Affan, and Ali ibn Abi Talib) were assassinated in early civil conflicts between Muslims. The practice was also well known in ancient China, as in Jing Ke's failed assassination of Qin king Ying Zheng in 227 BC. Whilst many assassinations were performed by individuals or small groups, there were also specialized units who used a collective group of people to perform more than one assassination. The earliest were the sicarii in 6 AD, who predated the Middle Eastern Assassins and Japanese shinobis by centuries.

During the Renaissance, tyrannicide became very common in Western Europe.

=== Modern history ===
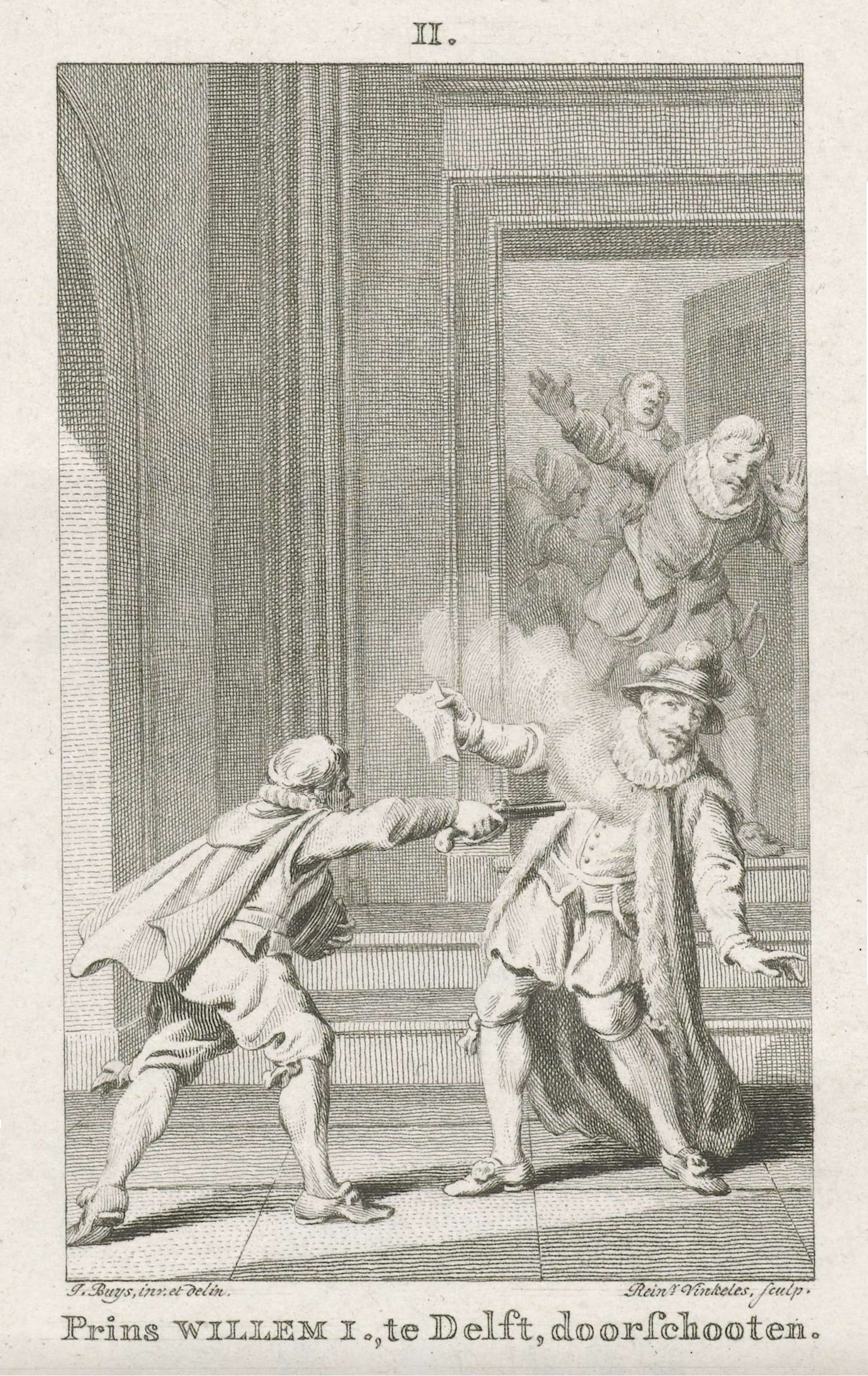
18th-century depiction of the assassination of William the Silent by Balthasar Gérard on 10 July 1584

During the 16th and 17th centuries, international lawyers began to voice condemnation of assassinations of leaders. Balthazar Ayala has been described as "the first prominent jurist to condemn the use of assassination in foreign policy". Alberico Gentili condemned assassinations in a 1598 publication where he appealed to the self-interest of leaders: (i) assassinations had adverse short-term consequences by arousing the ire of the assassinated leader's successor, and (ii) assassinations had the adverse long-term consequences of causing disorder and chaos. Hugo Grotius's works on the law of war strictly forbade assassinations, arguing that killing was only permissible on the battlefield. In the modern world, the killing of important people began to become more than a tool in power struggles between rulers themselves and was also used for political symbolism, such as in the propaganda of the deed.

In Japan, a group of assassins called the Four Hitokiri of the Bakumatsu killed a number of people, including Ii Naosuke who was the head of administration for the Tokugawa shogunate, during the Boshin War. Most of the assassinations in Japan were committed with bladed weaponry, a trait that was carried on into modern history. A video-record exists of the assassination of Inejiro Asanuma, using a sword.

In 1895, a group of Japanese Rōnin assassins killed the Korean queen (and posthumously empress) Myeongseong.

In the United States, from 1865 to 1963, four presidents—Abraham Lincoln, James A. Garfield, William McKinley and John F. Kennedy—died at the hands of assassins. There have been at least 20 known attempts on U.S. presidents' lives.

In Austria, the assassination of Archduke Franz Ferdinand and his wife Sophie, Duchess of Hohenberg was carried out in Sarajevo on June 28, 1914, by Gavrilo Princip, a Serbian nationalist. He is blamed for igniting World War I. Reinhard Heydrich died after an attack by British-trained Czechoslovak soldiers on behalf of the Czechoslovak government in exile in Operation Anthropoid, and knowledge from decoded transmissions allowed the United States to carry out a targeted attack, killing Japanese Admiral Isoroku Yamamoto while he was travelling by plane.

During the 1930s and 1940s, Joseph Stalin's NKVD carried out numerous assassinations outside of the Soviet Union, such as the killings of Organization of Ukrainian Nationalists leader Yevhen Konovalets, Ignace Poretsky, Fourth International secretary Rudolf Klement, Leon Trotsky, and the Workers' Party of Marxist Unification (POUM) leadership in Catalonia. India's "Father of the Nation", Mahatma Gandhi, was shot to death on January 30, 1948, by Nathuram Godse.

The African-American civil rights activist Martin Luther King Jr. was assassinated on April 4, 1968, at the Lorraine Motel (now the National Civil Rights Museum) in Memphis, Tennessee. Three years prior, another African-American civil rights activist, Malcolm X, was assassinated at the Audubon Ballroom on February 21, 1965.

=== Cold War to present ===
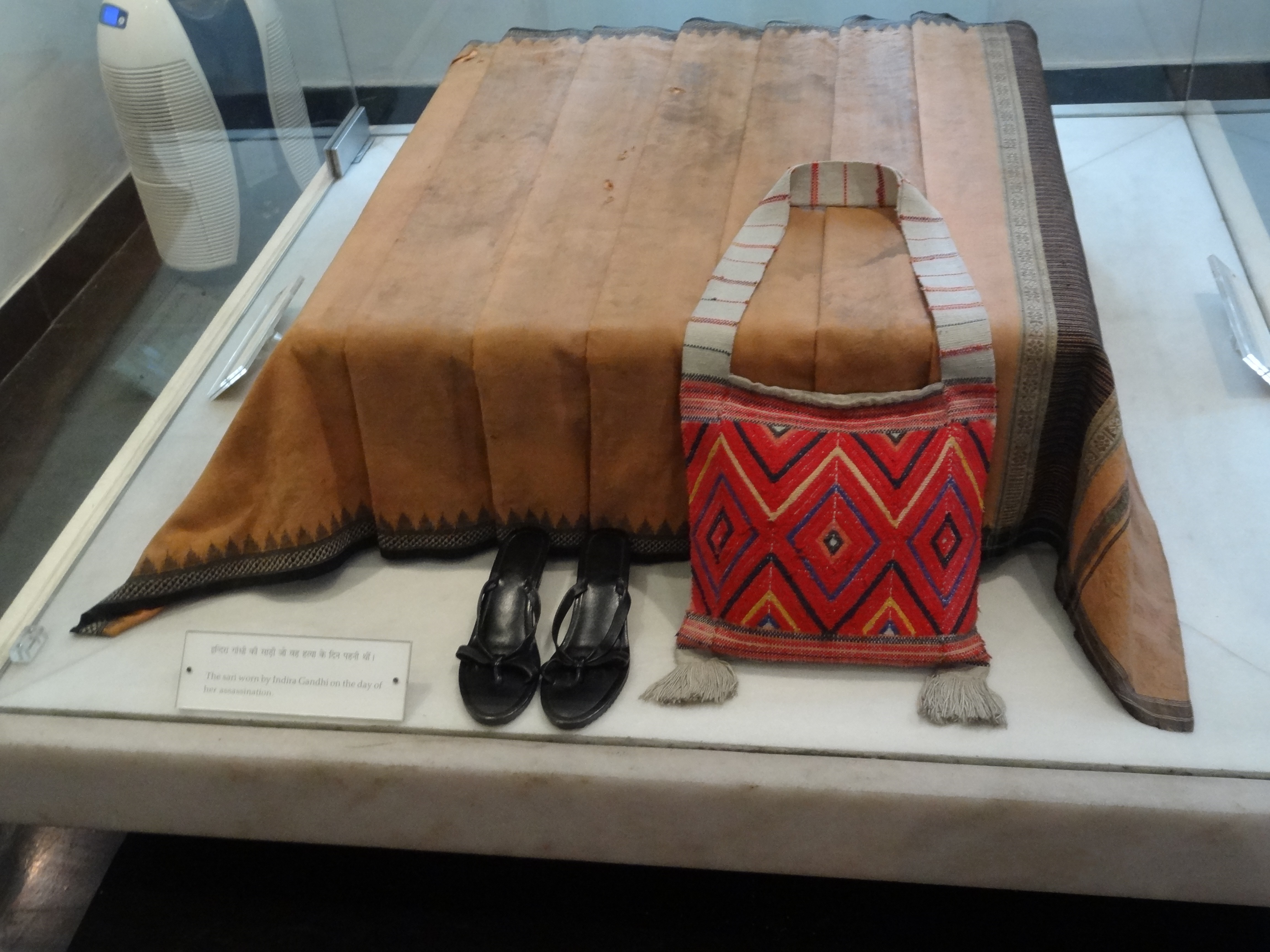
Indira Gandhi's blood-stained sari and belongings at the time of her assassination. She was the prime minister of India.

Most major powers repudiated Cold War assassination tactics, but many allege that was merely a smokescreen for political benefit and that covert and illegal training of assassins continues today, with Russia, Israel, the U.S., Argentina, Paraguay, Chile, and other nations accused of engaging in such operations. After the Iranian Revolution of 1979, the new Islamic government of Iran began an international campaign of assassination that lasted into the 1990s. At least 162 killings in 19 countries have been linked to the senior leadership of the Islamic Republic of Iran. The campaign came to an end after the Mykonos restaurant assassinations because a German court publicly implicated senior members of the government and issued arrest warrants for Ali Fallahian, the head of Iranian intelligence. Evidence indicates that Fallahian's personal involvement and individual responsibility for the murders were far more pervasive than his current indictment record represents.

In India, Prime Ministers Indira Gandhi and her son Rajiv Gandhi (neither of whom was related to Mahatma Gandhi, who had himself been assassinated in 1948), were assassinated in 1984 and 1991 in what were linked to separatist movements in Punjab and northern Sri Lanka, respectively.

On October 19, 1984, 37-year-old Father Jerzy Popiełuszko, a Roman Catholic priest in Warsaw, was assassinated by three Security Service agents in Włocławek, Poland.

In 1994, the assassination of Juvénal Habyarimana and Cyprien Ntaryamira during the Rwandan Civil War sparked the Rwandan genocide.

In Israel, Prime Minister Yitzhak Rabin was assassinated on November 4, 1995, by Yigal Amir, who opposed the Oslo Accords.

On September 2, 2022, a 35 year old Brazilian national attempted to assassinate the then vice-president of Argentina, Cristina Fernández de Kirchner. However, the attempt was unsuccessful because the assassin's gun jammed.

On September 10, 2025, American right-wing political activist and media personality Charlie Kirk was assassinated while speaking at a Turning Point USA rally at Utah Valley University.

==== United States government killing of citizens ====
In 2012, The New York Times revealed that the Obama administration maintained a "kill list" containing terrorism suspects. The list is sometimes referred to as a "disposition matrix", and President Obama made a final decision on whether anyone listed would be killed, without court oversight and without trial. In September 2011, American citizens Anwar Al-Awlaki and Samir Khan were assassinated in Yemen by the United States government via drone strikes. Two weeks later, Awlaki's 16-year-old son, also an American citizen, was killed in a strike targeting Ibrahim al-Banna, a senior operative in Al-Qaeda. Al-Banna was not killed in the strike.

== Further motivations ==
=== As a military and foreign policy doctrine ===
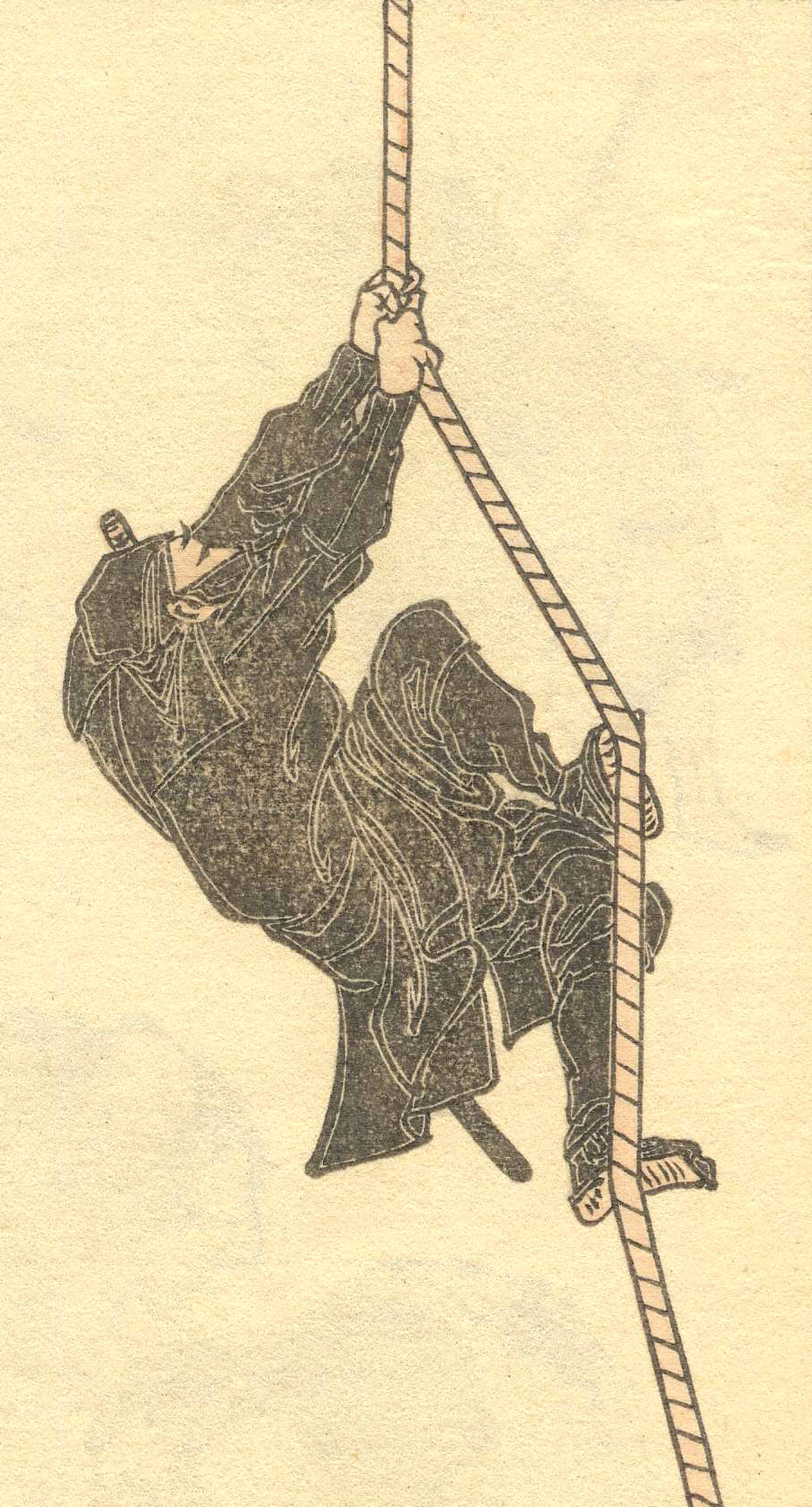
The functions of the ninja included espionage, sabotage and assassination.

Assassination for military purposes has long been espoused: Sun Tzu, writing around 500 BC, argued in favor of using assassination in his book The Art of War. Over 2000 years later, in his book The Prince, Machiavelli also advises rulers to assassinate enemies whenever possible to prevent them from posing a threat.

For similar and additional reasons, assassination has also sometimes been used in the conduct of foreign policy. The costs and benefits of such actions are difficult to compute. It may not be clear whether the assassinated leader gets replaced with a more or less competent successor, whether the assassination provokes ire in the state in question, whether the assassination leads to souring domestic public opinion, and whether the assassination provokes condemnation from third-parties. One study found that perceptual biases held by leaders often negatively affect decision making in that area, and decisions to go forward with assassinations often reflect the vague hope that any successor might be better.

In both military and foreign policy assassinations, there is the risk that the target could be replaced by an even more competent leader, or that such a killing (or a failed attempt) will prompt the masses to contemn the killers and support the leader's cause more strongly. Faced with particularly brilliant leaders, that possibility has in various instances been risked, such as in the attempts to kill the Athenian Alcibiades during the Peloponnesian War. A number of additional examples from World War II show how assassination was used as a tool:

- The assassination of Reinhard Heydrich in Prague on May 27, 1942, by the British and Czechoslovak government-in-exile. That case illustrates the difficulty of comparing the benefits of a foreign policy goal (strengthening the legitimacy and influence of the Czechoslovak government-in-exile in London) against the possible costs resulting from an assassination (the Lidice massacre).
- The American interception of Admiral Isoroku Yamamoto's plane during World War II after his travel route had been decrypted.
- Operation Gaff was a planned British commando raid to capture or kill the German field marshal Erwin Rommel, also known as "The Desert Fox".

Use of assassination has continued in more recent conflicts:

- During the Vietnam War, the US engaged in the Phoenix Program to assassinate Viet Cong leaders and sympathizers. It killed between 6,000 and 41,000 people, with official "targets" of 1,800 per month.
- With the January 3, 2020, Baghdad International Airport airstrike, the US assassinated the commander of Iran's Quds Force General Qasem Soleimani and the commander of Iraq's Popular Mobilization Forces Abu Mahdi al-Muhandis, along with eight other high-ranking military personnel. The assassination of the military leaders was part of escalating tensions between the US and Iran and the American-led intervention in Iraq.
- On February 28, 2026, at the beginning of the 2026 Iran war, Ali Khamenei, the Supreme Leader of Iran, was assassinated in a targeted airstrike in Tehran conducted by Israel and the US. Several other senior Iranian military and government officials were also killed in the strike.

=== As a tool of insurgents ===
The Irish Republican Army guerrillas in 1919 to 1921 killed many Royal Irish Constabulary Police intelligence officers during the Irish War of Independence. Michael Collins set up a special unit, the Squad, for that purpose, which intimidated many policemen into resigning from the force. The Squad's activities peaked with the killing of 14 British agents in Dublin on Bloody Sunday in 1920.

The tactic was used again by the Provisional IRA during the Troubles in Northern Ireland (1969–1998). Assassination of unionist politicians and activists was one of a number of methods used in the Provisional IRA campaign 1969–1997. The IRA also attempted to assassinate British Prime Minister Margaret Thatcher by bombing the Conservative Party Conference in a Brighton hotel. Loyalist paramilitaries retaliated by killing Catholics at random and assassinating Irish nationalist politicians.

Basque separatists ETA in Spain assassinated many security and political figures since the late 1960s, notably the president of the Francoist government of Spain, Luis Carrero Blanco, 1st Duke of Carrero-Blanco Grandee of Spain, in 1973. In the early 1990s, it also began to target academics, journalists and local politicians who publicly disagreed with it.

The Red Brigades in Italy carried out assassinations of political figures and, to a lesser extent, so did the Red Army Faction in Germany in the 1970s and the 1980s.

In the Vietnam War, communist insurgents routinely assassinated government officials and individual civilians deemed to offend or rival the revolutionary movement. Such attacks, along with widespread military activity by insurgent bands, almost brought the Ngo Dinh Diem regime to collapse before the US intervened.

== Psychology ==
A major study about assassination attempts in the US in the second half of the 20th century came to the conclusion that 80% of perpetrators spend copious amounts of time planning and preparing for their attempts, and almost all (97%) did so when their attempts were successful. Assassinations are thus rarely "impulsive" actions, mainly motivated by the desire to "save the world" (+40% of assassination attempts), to become notorious (38%) or to get killed (22%). However, about 25% of the actual attackers were found to be delusional, a figure that rose to 60% with "near-lethal approachers" (people apprehended before reaching their targets). That shows that while mental instability plays a role in many modern assassinations, the more delusional attackers are less likely to succeed in their attempts. The report also found that around two-thirds of attackers had previously been arrested, not necessarily for related offenses; 44% had a history of serious depression, and 39% had a history of substance abuse. The report found that most perpetrators were men (86%) or were unemployed (52%), and almost half of them had some form of college degree (46%) or served in military (42%). Women were more likely than men to carry out their attacks before getting arrested.

== Techniques ==
=== Modern methods ===
Explosives, especially the car bomb, become far more common in modern history, with grenades and remote-triggered land mines also used, especially in the Middle East and the Balkans; the initial attempt on Archduke Franz Ferdinand's life was with a grenade. With heavy weapons, the rocket-propelled grenade (RPG) has become a useful tool given the popularity of armored cars (discussed below), and Israeli forces have pioneered the use of aircraft-mounted missiles.

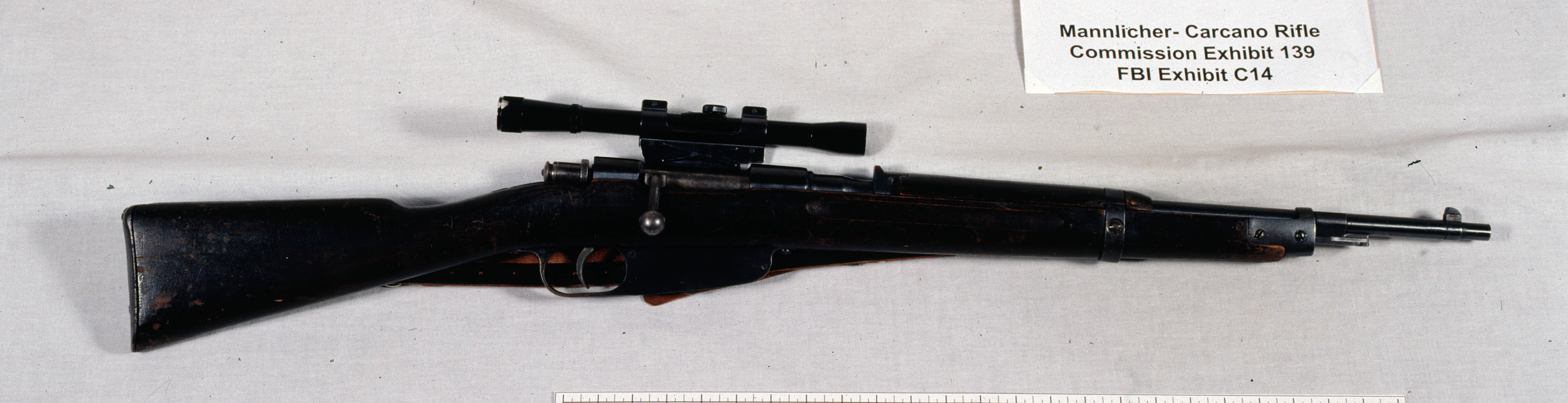
Carcano Model 38 of Lee Harvey Oswald, the assassin of President John F. Kennedy

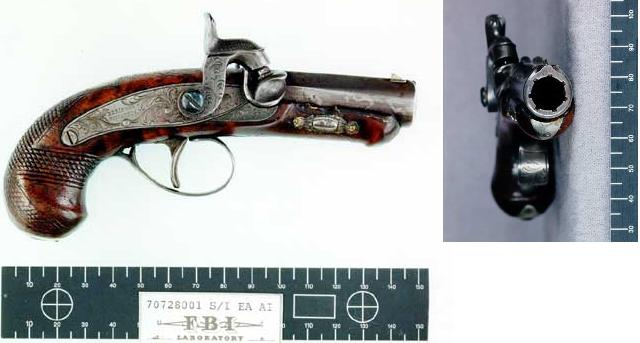
Derringer of John Wilkes Booth, the assassin of President Abraham Lincoln

A sniper with a precision rifle is often used in fictional assassinations; however, certain pragmatic difficulties attend long-range shooting, including finding a hidden shooting position with a clear line of sight, detailed advance knowledge of the intended victim's travel plans, the ability to identify the target at long range, and the ability to score a first-round lethal hit at long range, which is usually measured in hundreds of meters. A dedicated sniper rifle is also expensive, often costing thousands of dollars because of the high level of precision machining and hand finishing required to achieve extreme accuracy.

Despite their comparative disadvantages, handguns are more easily concealable and so are much more commonly used than rifles. Of the 74 principal incidents evaluated in a major study about assassination attempts in the US in the second half of the 20th century, 51% were undertaken by a handgun, 30% with a rifle or shotgun, 15% used knives, and 8% explosives (the use of multiple weapons/methods was reported in 16% of all cases).

In the case of state-sponsored assassination, poisoning can be more easily denied. Georgi Markov, a dissident from Bulgaria, was assassinated by ricin poisoning. A tiny pellet containing the poison was injected into his leg through a specially designed umbrella. Widespread allegations involving the Bulgarian government and the KGB have not led to any legal results. However, after the fall of the Soviet Union, it was learned that the KGB had developed an umbrella that could inject ricin pellets into a victim, and two former KGB agents who defected stated that the agency assisted in the murder. The CIA made several attempts to assassinate Fidel Castro; many of the schemes involving poisoning his cigars. In the late 1950s, the KGB assassin Bohdan Stashynsky killed Ukrainian nationalist leaders Lev Rebet and Stepan Bandera with a spray gun that fired a jet of poison gas from a crushed cyanide ampule, making their deaths look like heart attacks. A 2006 case in the UK concerned the assassination of Alexander Litvinenko who was given a lethal dose of radioactive polonium-210, possibly passed to him in aerosol form sprayed directly onto his food.

== Targeted killing ==
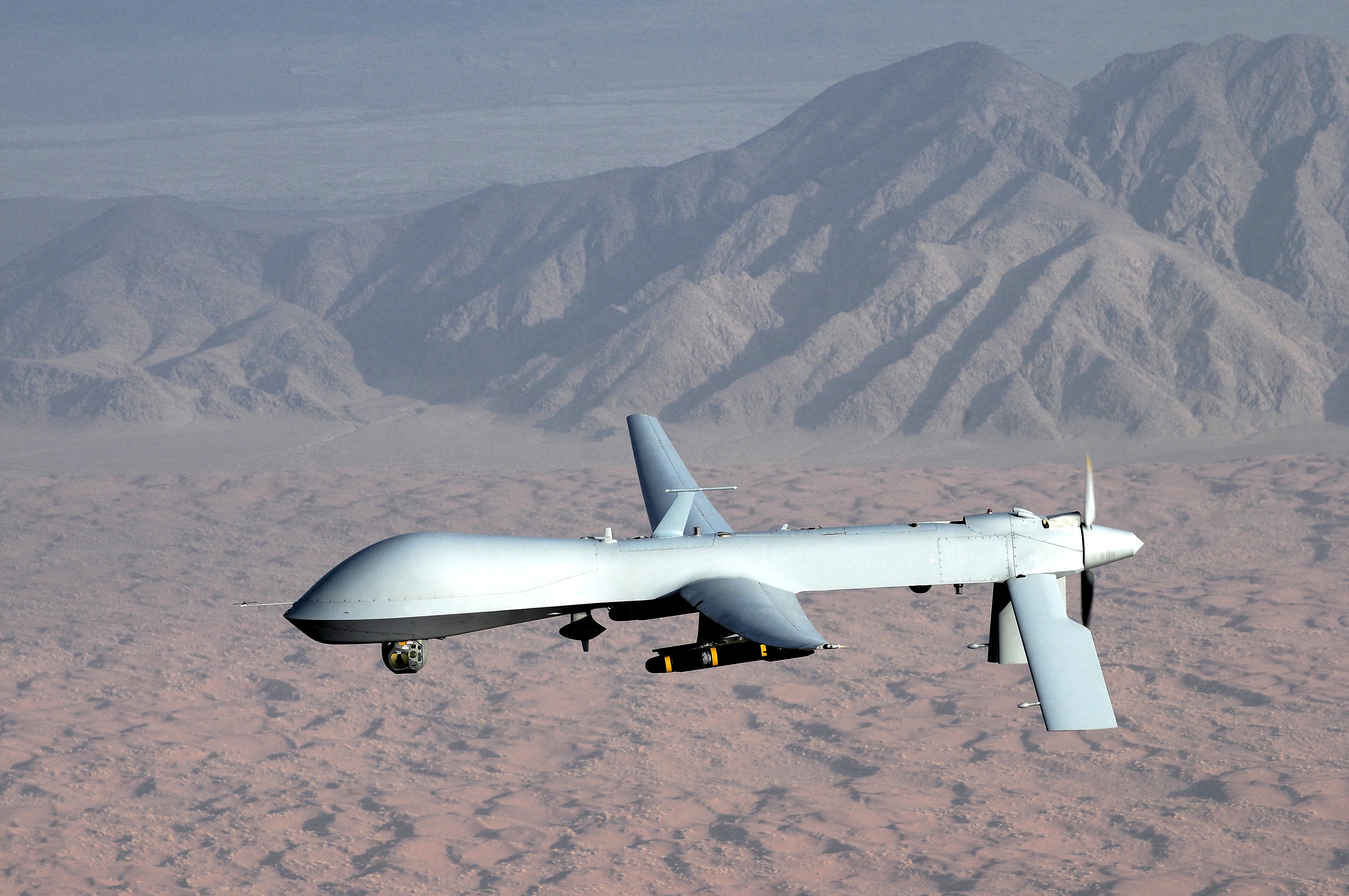
Predator combat drone; sometimes used in targeted killings

Targeted killing is the intentional killing by a government or its agents of a civilian or "unlawful combatant" who is not in the government's custody. The target is a person asserted to be taking part in an armed conflict or terrorism, by bearing arms or otherwise, who has thereby lost the immunity from being targeted that he would otherwise have under the Third Geneva Convention.

On the other hand, Gary D. Solis, a professor at Georgetown University Law Center, in his 2010 book The Law of Armed Conflict: International Humanitarian Law in War, wrote, "Assassinations and targeted killings are very different acts." The use of the term "assassination" is opposed, as it denotes murder (unlawful killing), but the terrorists are targeted in self-defense, which is thus viewed as a killing but not a crime (justifiable homicide). Abraham D. Sofaer, former federal judge for the US District Court for the Southern District of New York, wrote on the subject:

When people call a targeted killing an "assassination", they are attempting to preclude debate on the merits of the action. Assassination is widely defined as murder, and is for that reason prohibited in the United States ... U.S. officials may not kill people merely because their policies are seen as detrimental to our interests ... But killings in self-defense are no more "assassinations" in international affairs than they are murders when undertaken by our police forces against domestic killers. Targeted killings in self-defense have been authoritatively determined by the federal government to fall outside the assassination prohibition.

Author and former U.S. Army Captain Matthew J. Morgan argued that "there is a major difference between assassination and targeted killing ... targeted killing [is] not synonymous with assassination. Assassination ... constitutes an illegal killing." Similarly, Amos Guiora, a professor of law at the University of Utah, wrote, "Targeted killing is ... not an assassination." Steve David, professor of international relations at Johns Hopkins University, wrote, "There are strong reasons to believe that the Israeli policy of targeted killing is not the same as assassination." Syracuse Law William Banks and GW Law Peter Raven-Hansen wrote, "Targeted killing of terrorists is ... not unlawful and would not constitute assassination." Rory Miller writes: "Targeted killing ... is not 'assassination.'" Eric Patterson and Teresa Casale wrote, "Perhaps most important is the legal distinction between targeted killing and assassination."

On the other hand, the American Civil Liberties Union also states on its website, "A program of targeted killing far from any battlefield, without charge or trial, violates the constitutional guarantee of due process. It also violates international law, under which lethal force may be used outside armed conflict zones only as a last resort to prevent imminent threats, when non-lethal means are not available. Targeting people who are suspected of terrorism for execution, far from any war zone, turns the whole world into a battlefield."

Yael Stein, the research director of B'Tselem, the Israeli Information Center for Human Rights in the Occupied Territories, also stated in her article "By Any Name Illegal and Immoral: Response to 'Israel's Policy of Targeted Killing'":

The argument that this policy affords the public a sense of revenge and retribution could serve to justify acts both illegal and immoral. Clearly, lawbreakers ought to be punished. Yet, no matter how horrific their deeds, as the targeting of Israeli civilians indeed is, they should be punished according to the law. David's arguments could, in principle, justify the abolition of formal legal systems altogether.

Targeted killing has become a frequent tactic of the United States and Israel in asymmetric warfare. The tactic can raise complex questions and lead to contentious disputes as to the legal basis for its application, who qualifies as an appropriate "hit list" target, and what circumstances must exist before the tactic may be used. Opinions range from people considering it a legal form of self-defense that decreases terrorism to people calling it an extrajudicial killing that lacks due process and leads to further violence. Methods used have included firing Hellfire missiles from Predator or Reaper drones (unmanned, remote-controlled planes), detonating a cell phone bomb, and long-range sniper shooting. Countries such as the US (in Pakistan and Yemen) and Israel (in the West Bank and Gaza) have used targeted killing to eliminate members of groups such as Al-Qaeda and Hamas. In early 2010, with President Obama's approval, Anwar al-Awlaki became the first US citizen to be publicly approved for targeted killing by the Central Intelligence Agency. Awlaki was killed in a drone strike in September 2011.

United Nations investigator Ben Emmerson said that US drone strikes may have violated international humanitarian law. The Intercept reported, "Between January 2012 and February 2013, U.S. special operations airstrikes [in northeastern Afghanistan] killed more than 200 people. Of those, only 35 were the intended targets."

== Countermeasures ==
=== Early forms ===
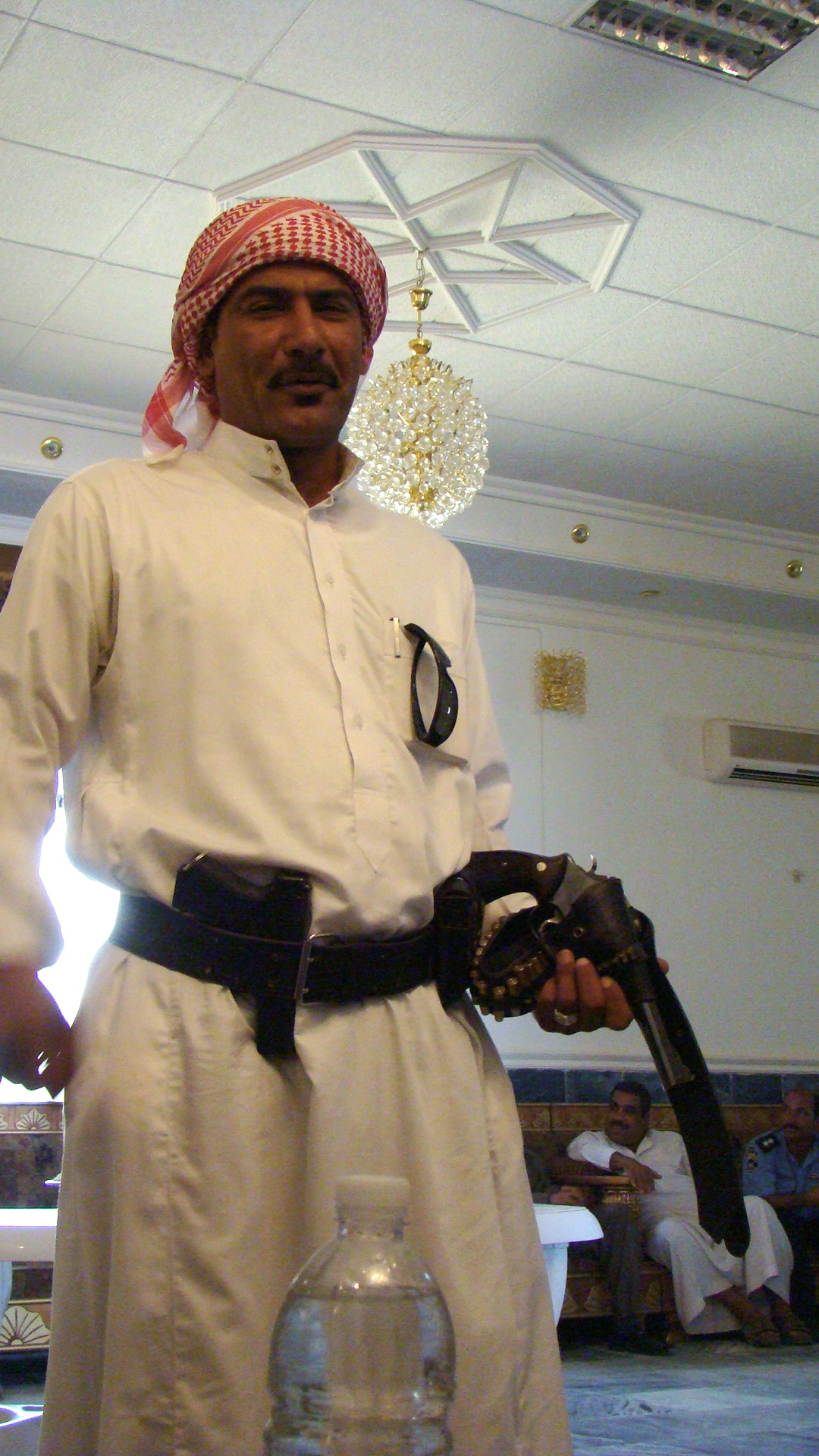
A bodyguard who was killed by an IED during Sheik Abdul Sattar Abu Risha's assassination in 2007.

One of the earliest forms of defense against assassins was employing bodyguards, who act as a shield for the potential target; keep a lookout for potential attackers, sometimes in advance, such as on a parade route; and putting themselves in harm's way, both by simple presence, showing that physical force is available to protect the target, and by shielding the target if any attack occurs. Failure to realize divided loyalties allowed the assassination of Indian Prime Minister Indira Gandhi, who was assassinated by two Sikh bodyguards in 1984.

=== Modern strategies ===
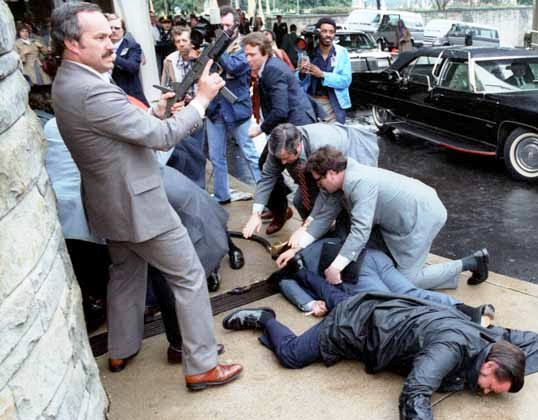
Assassination attempt on President Ronald Reagan

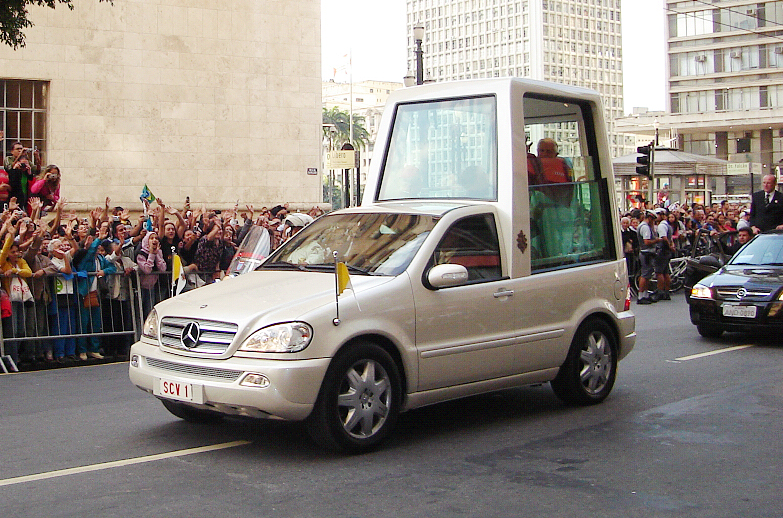
Pope Benedict XVI in a modified Mercedes-Benz M-Class Popemobile in São Paulo, Brazil

The methods used for protection by famous people have sometimes evoked negative reactions by the public, with some resenting the separation from their officials or major figures. One example might be traveling in a car protected by a bubble of clear bulletproof glass, such as the MRAP-like Popemobile of Pope John Paul II, built following an attempt at his life. Politicians often resent the need for separation and sometimes send their bodyguards away from them for personal or publicity reasons. US President William McKinley did so at the public reception in which he was assassinated.

Other potential targets go into seclusion and are rarely heard from or seen in public, such as writer Salman Rushdie. A related form of protection is the use of body doubles, people with similar builds to those they are expected to impersonate. These people are then made up and, in some cases, undergo plastic surgery to look like the target, with the body double then taking the place of the person in high-risk situations. According to Joe R. Reeder, Under Secretary of the Army from 1993 to 1997, Fidel Castro used body doubles.

US Secret Service protective agents receive training in the psychology of assassins.

=== Condemnation and deradicalisation ===
Condemnation of political violence, particularly when ideologically aligned, can reduce assassinations. Deradicalisation is the process to reduce support for violence.

== See also ==
- Assassinations in fiction
- Contract killing
- History of assassination
- Individual terror
- List of contract killers and hitmen
- List of assassinated and executed heads of state and government
- List of assassinations
- List of assassinations by firearm
- List of people who survived assassination attempts
- List of United States presidential assassination attempts and plots
- Special Activities Center of the Central Intelligence Agency
