= Operation Toucan (KGB) =

KGB/DGI propaganda campaign

- Russian: Операция «Тукан»
- Romanization: Operation Toucan
- IPA: Russian pronunciation: [ɐpʲɪˈrat͡sɨjə tʊˈkan]

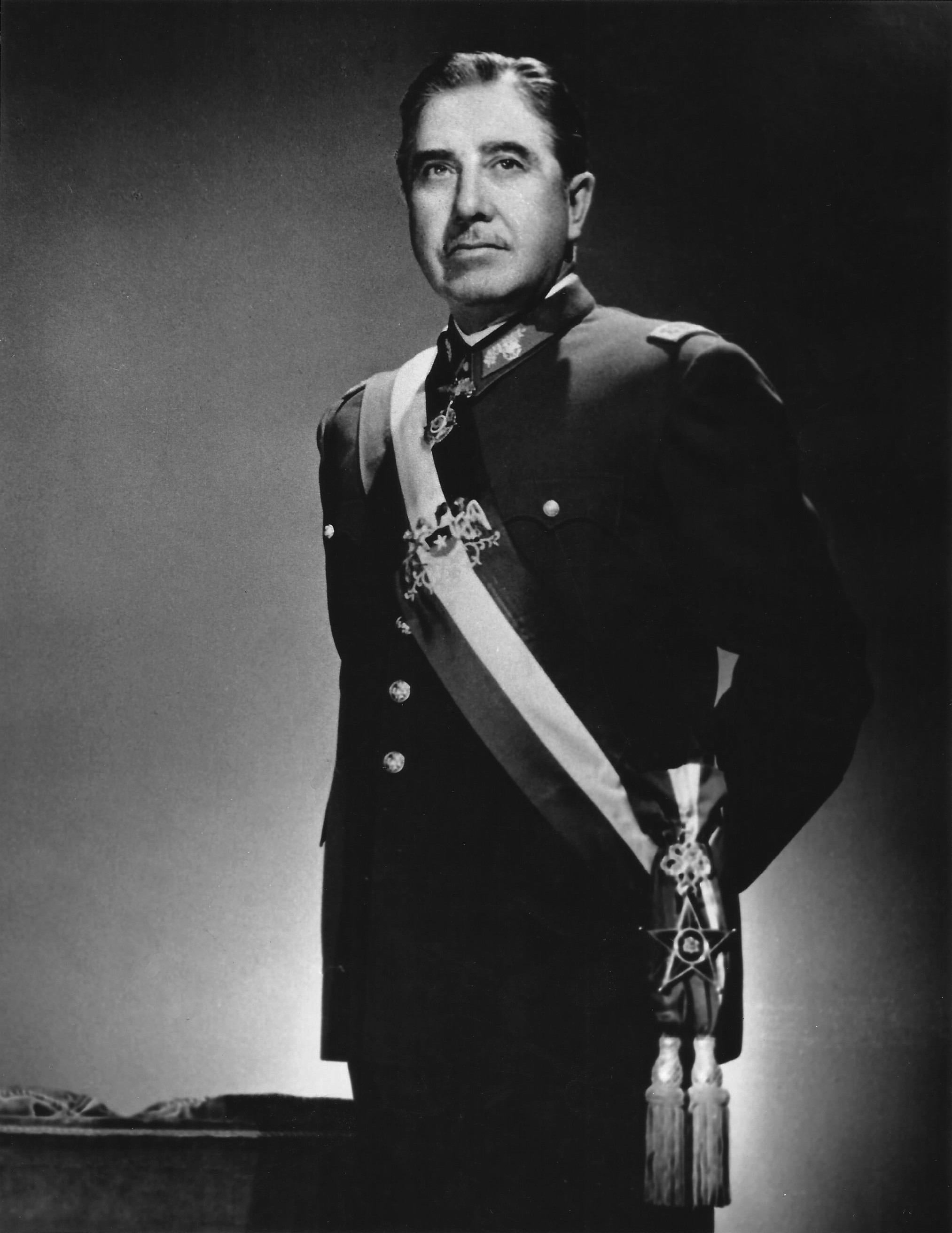
Augusto Pinochet

Operation TOUCAN was a KGB/DGI public relations and disinformation campaign directed at the military government of Chile led by Augusto Pinochet, particularly the Dirección de Inteligencia Nacional (DINA). The plot's twofold task was to organize sympathetic human rights activists to pressure the United Nations and generate negative press for the Pinochet regime. According to former KGB officer Vasili Mitrokhin, the plot was originally conceived by Yuri Vladimirovich Andropov. It was approved on August 10, 1976.

== Activities ==
As part of operation TOUCAN, the KGB forged a letter tying the CIA to an assassination campaign by Chile's DINA and many journalists, including columnist Jack Anderson of the New York Times, used this information in their news stories as evidence of the CIA's involvement in the more nefarious parts of Operation Condor.

The KGB forged letters from Manuel Contreras, DINA's director, to Pinochet, which were accepted as genuine by the newspaper and other major news outlets in the West. One of these included a letter "sent" by Contreras to Pinochet detailing a plan to neutralize the opposition figures living in Mexico, Argentina, Costa Rica, France, Italy, and the United States.

When the operation ended, it was marked "particularly successful in publicizing and exaggerating DINA's foreign operations against left wing Chilean exiles."
