= History of assassination =

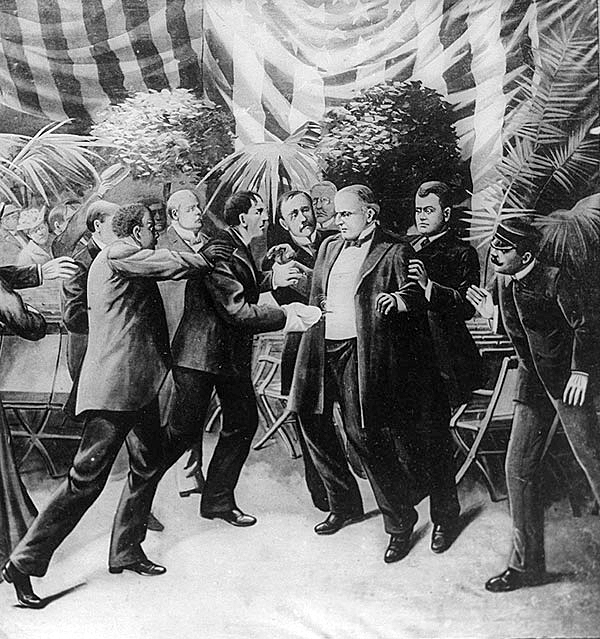
Leon Czolgosz shoots United States President William McKinley in 1901, with a concealed revolver.

Assassination, the killing of an opponent or well-known public figure, dates back to the earliest human societies in world history.

== Ancient history ==
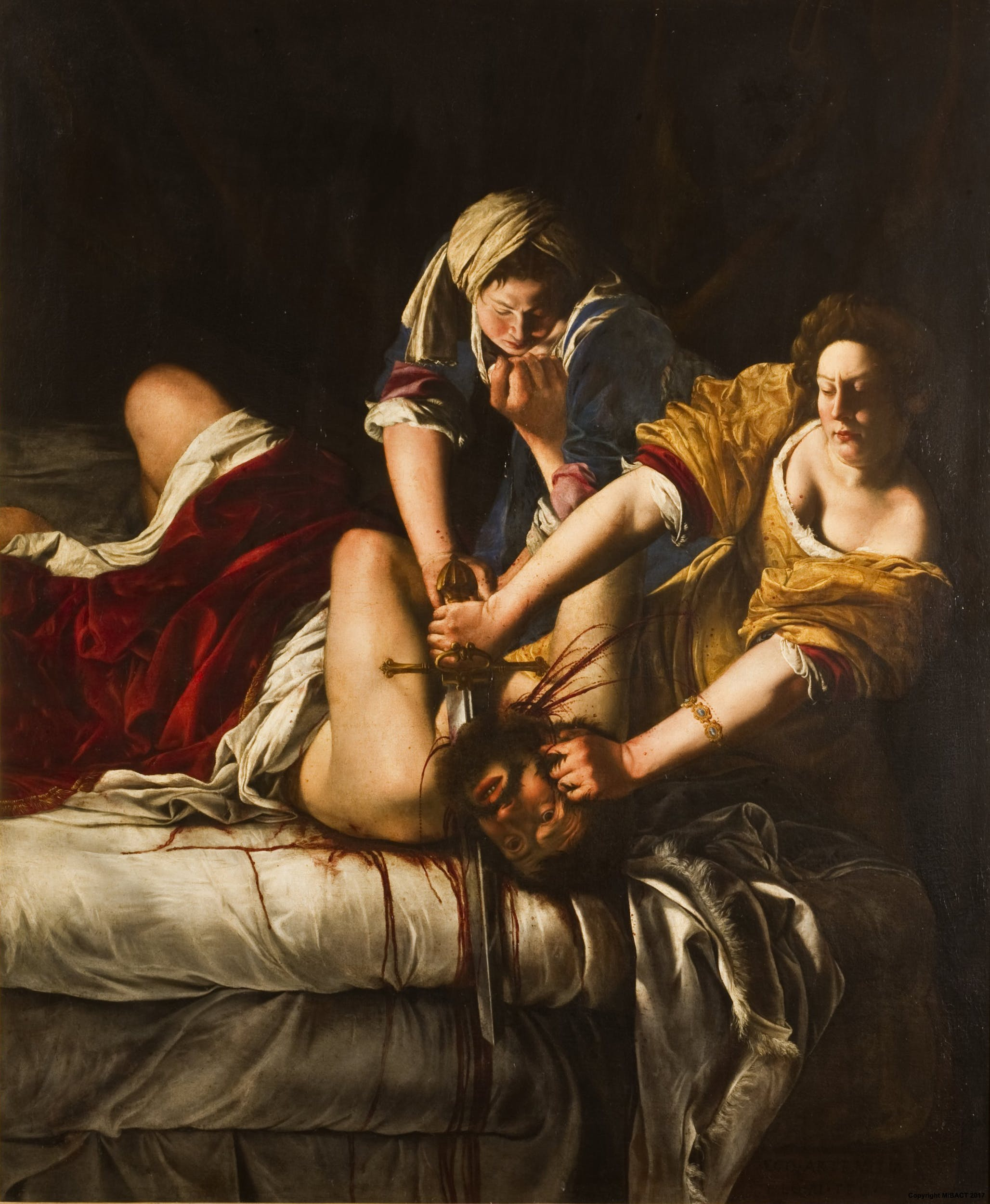
Judith killing Holofernes, by Artemisia Gentileschi

The Egyptian pharaoh Teti, of the Old Kingdom Sixth Dynasty (23rd century BCE), is thought to be the earliest known victim of assassination, though written records are scant and thus evidence is circumstantial. Two further ancient Egyptian monarchs are more explicitly recorded to have been assassinated; Amenemhat I of the Middle Kingdom Twelfth Dynasty (20th century BCE) is recorded to have been assassinated in his bed by his palace guards for reasons unknown (as related in the Instructions of Amenemhat); meanwhile contemporary judicial records relate the assassination of New Kingdom Twentieth Dynasty monarch Ramesses III in 1155 BCE as part of a failed coup attempt. The Assyrian king Sennacherib was assassinated by his sons in 681 BC, Adrammelech and Sharezer, an event corroborated by both biblical records (2 Kings 19:37) and contemporary Assyrian and Babylonian chronicles. Between 550 BC and 330 BC, seven Persian kings of the Achaemenid Dynasty were murdered. The Art of War, a 5th century BC Chinese military treatise, mentions tactics of assassination.

Chanakya (c. 350–283 BC), an Indian teacher, philosopher and royal advisor, wrote about assassinations in detail in his political treatise Arthashastra. His student Chandragupta Maurya, the founder of the Maurya Empire of India, later made use of assassinations against some of his enemies, including two of Alexander's generals Nicanor and Philip.

=== Roman history ===
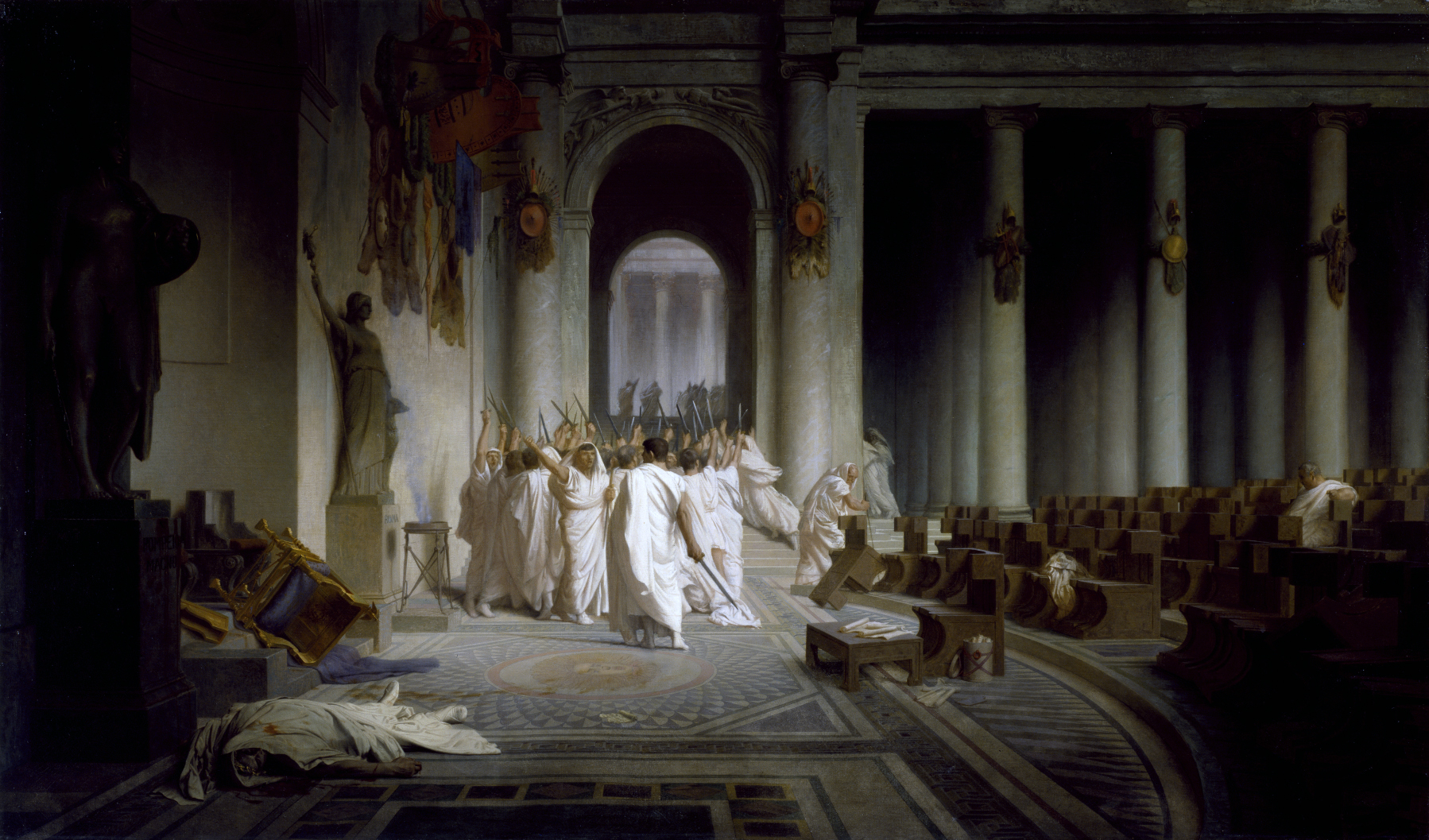
The Death of Caesar by Gérôme

Some of the most famous assassinations in history have taken place in the Rome. Arguably the most famous assassination is that of Gaius Julius Caesar. After Caesar won the civil war in 49 BCE, he was proclaimed dictator perpetuo, (dictator in perpetuity) which led some members of the senate of the Roman Republic to see this as the end of the republic and the establishment of a monarchy or tyranny. On the Ides of March (March 15) of 44 BC, conspirators including Marcus Junius Brutus the Younger and Cassius waited until Caesar arrived in the Senate, where they stabbed him to death. When he was dying, Caesar is said to have looked at Brutus and allegedly uttered "Kaì sú, téknon" (meaning "You too, child").

One of the earliest accounts of a historical assassination society were the Jewish sicarii in 6 A.D. during the Roman occupation of Israel. This group performed high-risk assassinations of Roman military individuals and other Jewish countrymen who have sided with them, with the use of daggers hidden in cloaks, sometimes performed in broad daylight before disappearing in the crowd. One of their most infamous assassinations was that of Jonathan the High Priest. Their name comes from the latin word sica, a type of dagger. To this day sicario (plural sicari) means "hit man" or "assassin" in Italian.

== The Middle Ages and early-Modern period ==
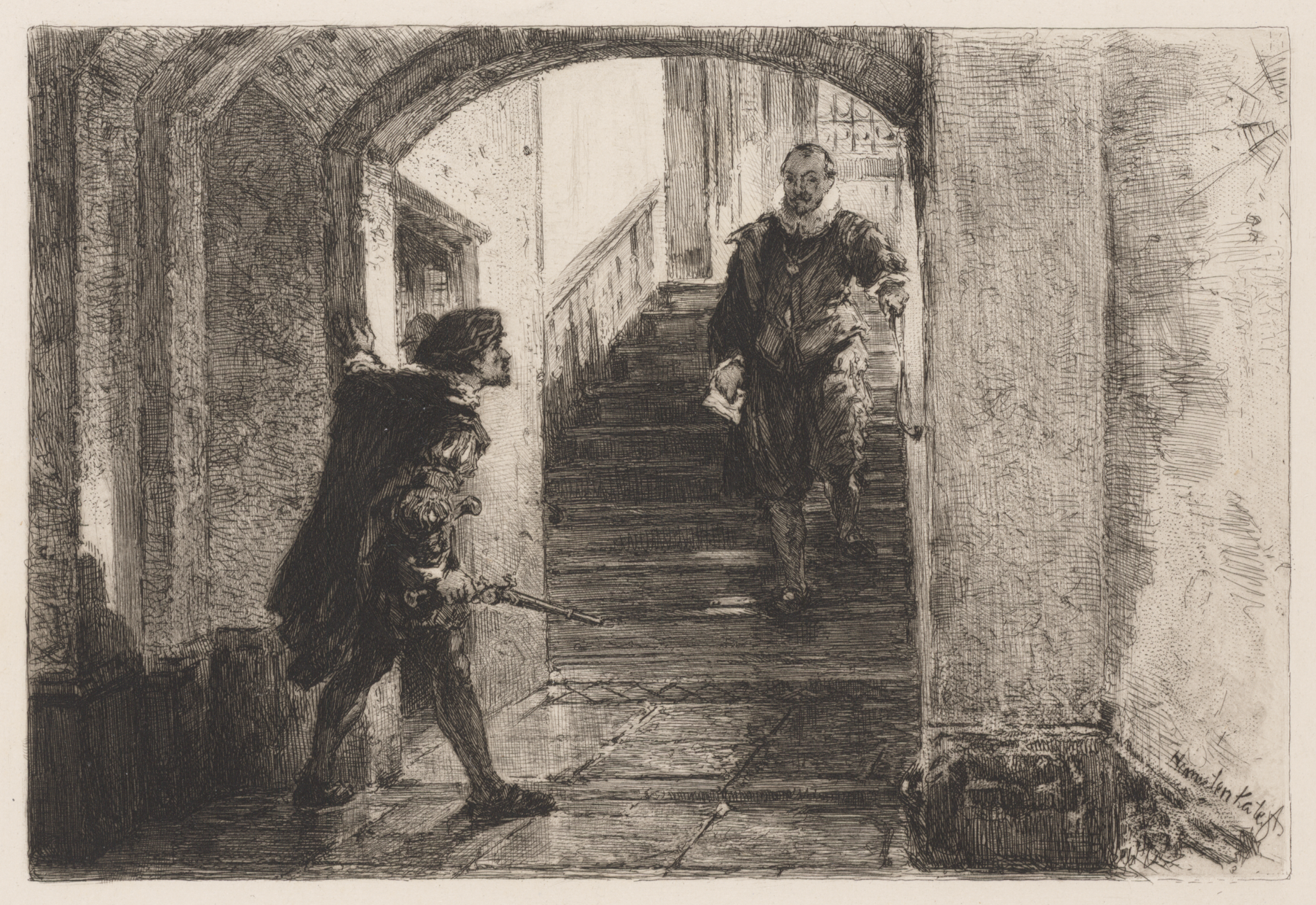
The assassination of William the Silent by Balthasar Gérard

Several European monarchs and other leading figures were assassinated during religious wars or by religious opponents, for example Henry III and Henry IV of France, and the Protestant Dutch leader, William the Silent.

Thomas Becket was promoted to the position of Archbishop of Canterbury by King Henry II of England because Becket was part of the King's personal counsel and was also a major supporter of the King's claims on French land. Becket did not like his new position and found support with the Pope Alexander III, so when Henry sought Becket's support for a lessened Papal grip on England, Becket refused and supported the Church and the Pope. Henry II didn't outright call for Thomas Becket's assassination after this point, but he is reported to have said, "Will no one rid me of this turbulent priest?" As a result, Becket was assassinated by four knights: Reginald Fitzurse, Hugh de Morville, Lord of Westmorland, William de Tracy, and Richard le Breton.

The Hashshashin, a Muslim group in the Middle Ages-Middle East, was well known for performing assassinations in the style of close combat. The word assassin was derived from the name of their group. In Feudal Japan, ninjas or shinobis were hired from both the aristocracy and the peasantry to spy on enemy factions, perform arsonism and disruptions, as well as infiltrating and assassinations.

== Late Modern history ==
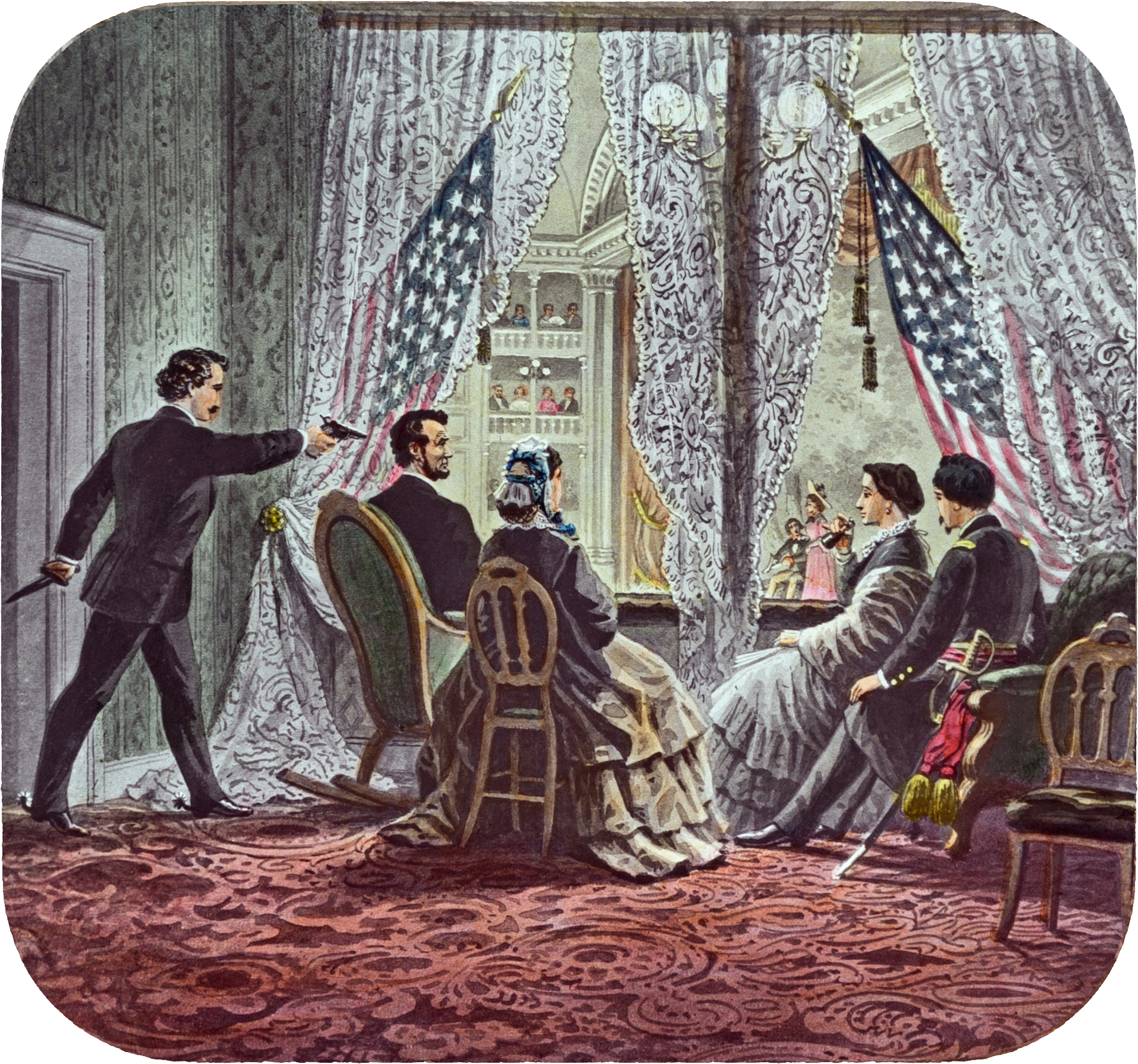
Shown in the presidential box of Ford's Theatre, from left to right, are assassin John Wilkes Booth, Abraham Lincoln, Mary Todd Lincoln, Clara Harris, and Henry Rathbone

=== Pre-World War I ===
In Russia, five emperors were assassinated within less than 200 years – Ivan VI, Peter III, Paul I, Alexander II and Nicholas II (along with his family: his wife, Alexandra; daughters Olga, Tatiana, Maria and Anastasia, and son Alexei). In the United Kingdom, only one Prime Minister of the United Kingdom has ever been assassinated—Spencer Perceval on May 11, 1812.

The most notable assassination victim within early U.S. history was President Abraham Lincoln. Two other U.S. Presidents have been killed by assassination before World War I: James Garfield, William McKinley. Presidents Andrew Jackson and Theodore Roosevelt survived significant assassination attempts. Roosevelt was shot and wounded during the 1912 presidential campaign.

In Europe the assassination of Archduke Franz Ferdinand by Gavrilo Princip, one of several Serb nationalist insurgents, triggered World War I. Archduke Franz Ferdinand was visiting Bosnia-Herzegovina, since it was newly annexed to the Austro-Hungarian Empire. He had a route through the city streets of Sarajevo, Bosnia, but was redirected to a back alley. He changed his course and as he was led around the corner out of the back alley and back onto the main street, Gavrilo Princip shot Franz Ferdinand and his wife (Sophie, Duchess of Hohenberg). This assassination brought the Austro-Hungarian Empire into a state of outrage.

=== Post-World War I ===
India's "Father of the Nation", Mohandas K. Gandhi, was shot and killed on January 30, 1948 by Nathuram Godse, for what Godse perceived as his betrayal of the Hindu cause in attempting to seek peace between Hindus and Muslims.

=== Cold War and beyond ===
The Cold War saw a dramatic increase in the number of political assassinations. The Most famous modern assassination is that of President John F. Kennedy. During the Kennedy era, Fidel Castro had been plotted against several times at the hands of the CIA and CIA-backed rebels. The KGB made use of assassination to deal with high-profile defectors such as Georgi Markov.

== Country-specific ==
=== In the Israeli–Palestinian conflict ===
In the course of the Israeli–Palestinian conflict, the Israel Defense Forces (IDF) employed what they call "focused foiling" (Hebrew: סיכול ממוקד sikul memukad), or targeted killing, against those suspected by Israel of intending to perform a specific act of violence in the very near future, or to be linked indirectly with several acts of violence (organizing, planning, researching means of destruction, etc.), thus raising the likelihood that his or her killing would foil similar activities in the future. Usually, such strikes have been carried out by Israeli Air Force attack helicopters that fire guided missiles at the target, after the Shin Bet supplies intelligence for the target.

==== Related controversies ====
Defenders of targeted killings point out that it is in accordance with the Fourth Geneva Convention (Part 3, Article 1, Section 28), which reads: "The presence of a protected person may not be used to render certain points or areas immune from military operations," and so they argue that international law explicitly gives Israel the right to conduct military operations against military targets under these circumstances.

==== Israeli public support ====
Targeted killings are largely supported by Israeli society to various extents, but there are exceptions: In 2003, 27 IAF Air Force pilots sent a letter of protest to Air Force commander Dan Halutz, refusing to attack targets within Palestinian population centers, and saying that the mistreatment of the Palestinians "morally corrupts the fabric of Israeli society". The letter, the first of its kind emanating from the Air Force, evoked a storm of political protest in Israel, with most circles condemning it as dereliction of duty. IDF ethics forbid soldiers from making public political affiliations, and subsequently the IDF chief of staff announced that all the signatories would be suspended from flight duty, after which some of the pilots recanted and removed their signature.

==== Well-known Israeli operations ====
Some of the best-known targeted killings by Israeli military were Hamas leaders Salah Shahade (July 2002), Sheikh Ahmed Yassin (March 2004), Abdel Aziz al-Rantissi (April 2004), and Adnan al-Ghoul (October 2004).

- Mossad assassinations following the Munich massacre against Black September, perpetrators of the 1972 Munich massacre
- Operation Spring of Youth against top PLO leaders in Beirut, Lebanon, 1973
- Abu Jihad (Fatah) in Tunis, 1988
- Fathi Shaqaqi (Palestinian Islamic Jihad) in Malta, 1995
- Yahya Ayyash (Hamas bombmaker, "the engineer") in Gaza, 1996
- Khaled Mashal (Hamas, foiled) in Jordan, 1997

While most killings throughout the course of the Israeli-Palestinian conflict were carried out by the IDF against Palestinian leaders of what Israel says are terror factions, Israeli minister Rehavam Zeevi was assassinated by the Popular Front for the Liberation of Palestine (PFLP), a militant group listed as a terror organization by the U.S. and the EU.

==== Palestinian attacks and Israeli response ====
Palestinian attacks against Israel have been costly for Israel. IDF reports show that from the start of the Second Intifada (in 2000) to 2005, Palestinians killed 1,074 Israelis and wounded 7,520. These are serious figures for such a small country, roughly equivalent to 50,000 dead and 300,000 wounded in the United States over five years. Such losses generated immense public pressure from the Israeli public for a forceful response, and ramped-up targeted killings were one such outcome.

While Palestinian operations caused substantial damage, there is also evidence that the IDF reprisal targeted killing policy has been salutary in reducing the effectiveness of such attacks. As regarding Hamas, for example, although Hamas attacks increased between 2001 and 2005, Israeli deaths dropped as the people targeted for killing were killed, reduced from a high of 75 in 2001, to 21 in 2005. So even as the total number of Hamas operations climbed, deaths resulting from such attacks plunged, suggesting that the effectiveness of such attacks was being continually weakened.

Continual diplomatic pressure against the Israeli policy, and the announcement of temporary cease-fires at various times by Hamas are seen by some as further proof of the policy's efficacy. Some observers, however, argue that other factors are at play, including improved intelligence-gathering leading to more arrests, and the construction of the Israeli West Bank barrier which has made it more difficult for terrorists to infiltrate.

=== United States ===
In 1943, the United States military used knowledge from decoded transmissions to carry out a targeted killing of the Japanese Admiral Isoroku Yamamoto.

During the Cold War, the U.S. attempted several times to assassinate Cuban President Fidel Castro.

In 1981, President Ronald Reagan issued Executive Order 12333, which codified a policy first laid down in 1976 by the Ford administration. It stated, "No person employed by or acting on behalf of the United States Government shall engage in, or conspire to engage in, assassination."

In 1986, the American air strikes against Libya included an attack on the barracks where Muammar al-Gaddafi was known to be sleeping. It was claimed that the attack resulted in the death of Gaddafi's infant daughter but reporter Barbara Slavin of USA Today who was in Libya at the time, set the record straight. "His adopted daughter was not killed," she said. "An infant girl was killed. I actually saw her body. She was adopted posthumously by Gadhafi. She was not related to Gadhafi."

On November 3, 2002, a US Central Intelligence Agency-operated MQ-1 Predator unmanned aerial vehicle (UAV) fired a Hellfire missile that destroyed a car carrying six suspected al-Qaeda operatives in Yemen. The target of the attack was Qaed Salim Sinan al-Harethi, the top al-Qaeda operative in Yemen. Among those killed in the attack was a US citizen, Yemeni-American Kamal Derwish.

According to Bush administration, the killing of an American in this fashion was legal. "I can assure you that no constitutional questions are raised here. There are authorities that the president can give to officials. He's well within the balance of accepted practice and the letter of his constitutional authority," said Condoleezza Rice, the US national security adviser.

During the press-conference, the US State Department spokesman Richard Boucher said that Washington's reasons for opposing the targeted killings of Palestinians might not apply in other circumstances and denied allegation that by staging the Yemen operation the US may be using double standards towards Israeli policy: "We all understand the situation with regard to Israeli–Palestinian issues and the prospects of peace and the prospects of negotiation ... and of the need to create an atmosphere for progress. ... A lot of different things come into play there. ... Our policy on targeted killings in the Israeli-Palestinian context has not changed."

On December 3, 2005, the US was blamed for another incident, in which alleged al-Qaeda #3 man (operations chief Abu Hamza Rabia) was reportedly killed in Pakistan by an airborne missile, together with four associates. However, Pakistani officials claim the group was killed while preparing explosives, not from any targeted military operation. The US has made no official comment about the incident.

On January 13, 2006 US CIA-operated unmanned Predator drones launched four Hellfire missiles into the Pakistani village of Damadola, about 7 km (4.3 mi) from the Afghan border, killing at least 18 people. The attack targeted Ayman al-Zawahiri who was thought to be in the village. Pakistani officials later said that al-Zawahiri was not there and that the U.S. had acted on faulty intelligence.

On June 7, 2006, US Forces dropped one laser-guided bomb and one GPS-guided bomb on a safehouse north of Baqubah, Iraq, where Al-Qaeda in Iraq leader Abu Musab al-Zarqawi was believed to be meeting with several aides. His death was confirmed the next day.

On May 2, 2011, Osama bin Laden, the founder of the militant Islamist organization al-Qaeda, was killed by gunshot wounds in a raid by United States special operations forces on his safe house in Bilal Town, Abbottabad, Pakistan.

On January 3, 2020, United States assassinated Iran's second most powerful man – Qasem Soleimani, and deputy commander of the Popular Mobilization Forces Abu Mahdi al-Muhandis in Baghdad.

=== Modern India ===
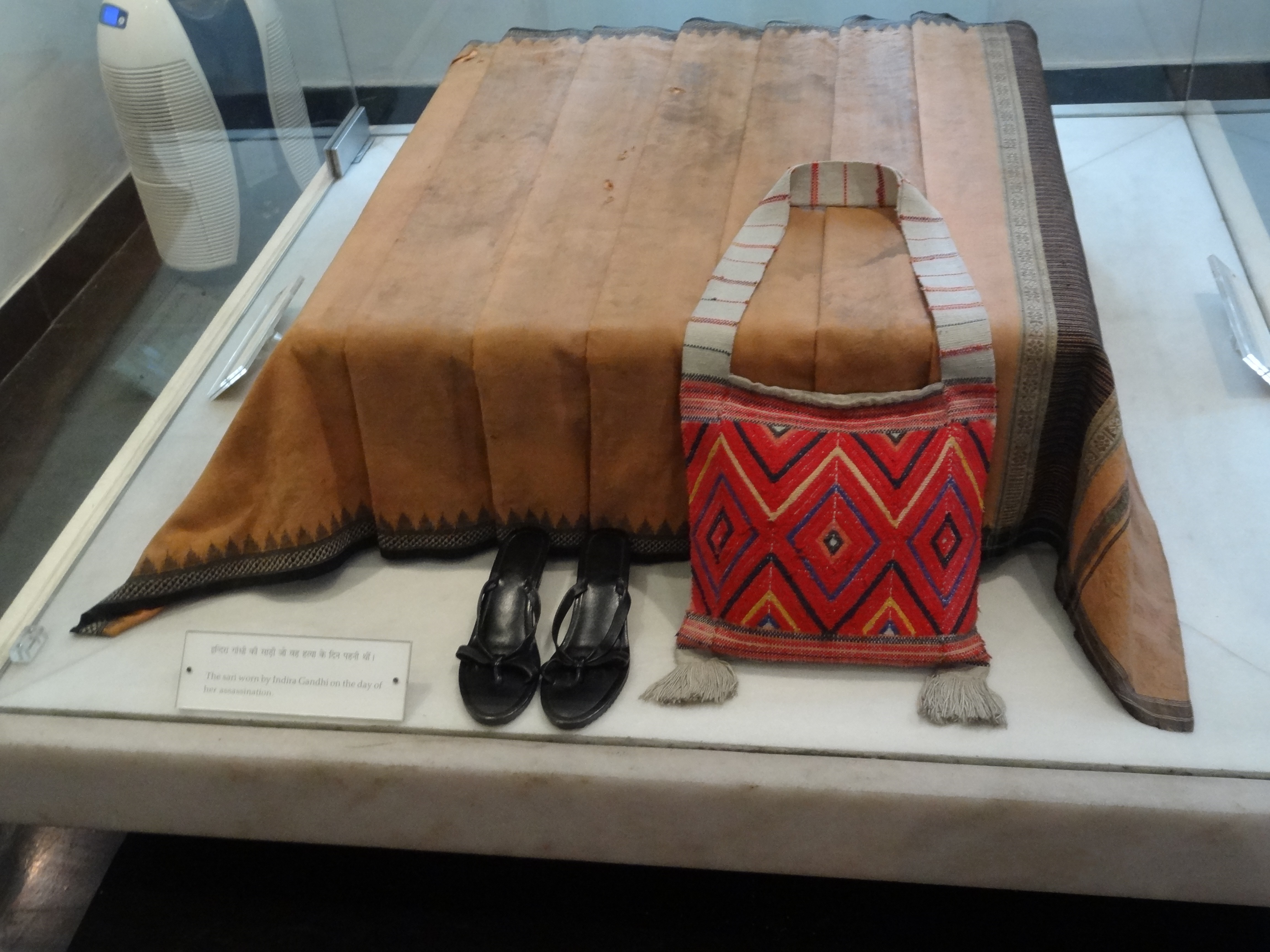
Indira Gandhi’s bloodstained sari from her assassination

India saw assassination – Mahatma Gandhi on 30 January 1948 by one Nathuram Godse. During the subsequent trial, and in various witness accounts and books written since, the motivation of Godse has been summarized, speculated about and debated. Godse did not deny killing Gandhi, and made a long statement explaining his motivations for the assassination of Gandhi.

India's third Prime minister – Indira Gandhi was assassinated in 1984 by Sikh Extremists in retaliation at her decision to storm the Golden Temple in Amritsar. Her son Rajiv Gandhi too was assassinated by the LTTE in 1991.

=== Russia (post-communism) ===
In the poisoning of Alexander Litvinenko of 2006, a former KGB officer was murdered in Great Britain by means of the radioactive element polonium-210. Litvinenko had obtained political asylum in Great Britain, and was an outspoken critic of Vladimir Putin and the Russian security services. It was reported that the source of the polonium had been traced to a Russian nuclear power plant, and Russia subsequently refused Britain's request to extradite ex-KGB bodyguard Andrey Lugovoy to face murder charges; Lugovoy was later elected to the Russian State Duma. Litvinenko himself blamed his murder on Putin.

== See also ==
- Assassinations in fiction
- Contract killing
- Individual terror
