= Ze'ev Iviansky =

Israeli political scientist (1923–2022)

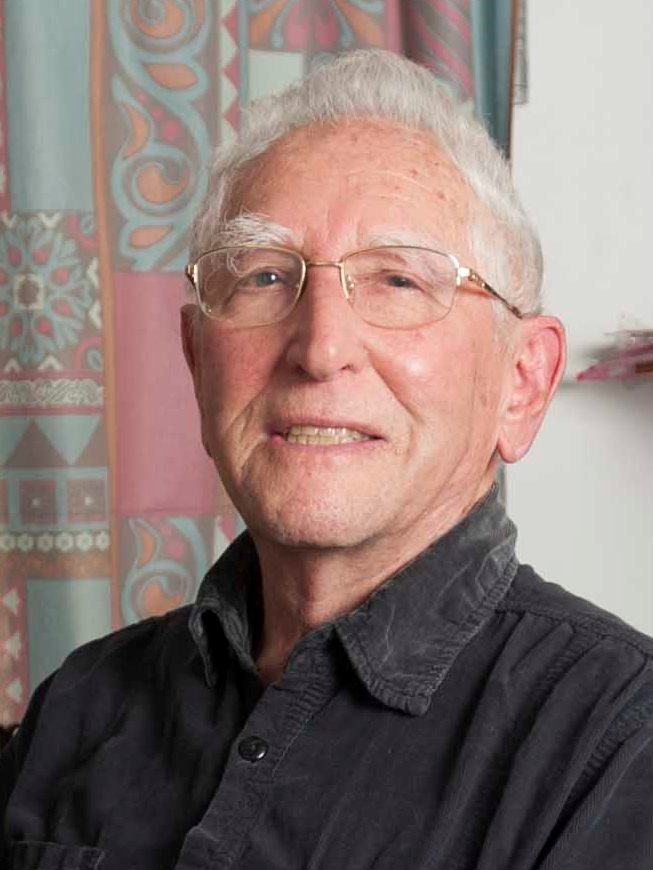
Iviansky in 2012

Ze'ev Iviansky (Hebrew: זאב איביאנסקי; 1 December 1923 – 22 December 2022) was an Israeli political scientist and a former lecturer at the department of General History and Russian Studies of the Hebrew University.

== Biography ==
Iviansky was born on 1 December 1923. He was the author of the book Individual Terror, Theory and Practice (1977) and numerous articles on terrorism. He has also made significant contributions to 1905 - Revolution and Terror, 1988 (in Hebrew).

Iviansky was a member of Lehi.

Iviansky died on 22 December 2022, at the age of 99.
