= Individual terror =

Category of political killing

In leftist terminology, individual terror, a form of revolutionary terror, is the murder of isolated individuals with the goal of promotion of a political movement, of provoking political changes, up to political revolution. As such, it differs from other forms of targeted killing, in particular, the close type of individual murder, the ancient practice of political assassination.

== Individual terror vs. political assassination ==
Many authors do not draw distinction between types of political assassinations and furthermore, and there is no full consensus on the issue.

Ze'ev Iviansky attempted to draw a distinction as follows. While revolutionary individual terror and traditional political assassination share the common goal, a major political change, they differ in various aspects: tactics, methods, role, view on the society, and significance of an individual act. Most of the differences stem from the immediate purpose of an individual act.

In traditional political assassination the target of the killing is a central political figure, such as the king or dictator, whose removal would give way to political changes, and as such the choice of the target is of primary importance. The ultimate goal is to hit the regime represented by the target. Whereas in individual terror, the choice of the target, while important, is secondary to the primary goal, which is to bring the attention of the public to a political movement and to promote the political movement.

This key distinction explains differences in tactics. While traditional political assassination may well be clandestine, the efficiency of revolutionary individual terror in a greater extent depends on the publicity of the act.

The target of a political assassination is usually a very specific individual, while the target of an act of terrorism is not.

David C. Rapoport (1971) drew the difference as follows: "...the assassin destroys men who are corrupting the system, while the terrorist destroys a system which has already corrupted everyone it touches..."

== History ==
The roots of individual terror as revolutionary tactics lie in the second half of the 19th century in Europe. Part of its theoretical base was "propaganda by deed" put forth by the ideologists of anarchism. Different revolutionary parties had different attitude to individual terror, for political, tactical, moral, and other reasons.

== See also ==
- Extrajudicial killing
- Lone wolf terrorism
