= Steven R. David =

- Born: 1951 (age 74–75)
- Education: B.A. from Union College (1972); M.A.s from Stanford University (1975) and Harvard University (1977); Ph.D. from Harvard University (1980)
- Employer: Johns Hopkins University
- Known for: Expert in international relations, security studies, and the developing world
- Notable work: Catastrophic consequences: civil wars and American interests (2008)
- Title: Professor of International Relations

Steven R. David (born 1951) is Professor of International Relations at Johns Hopkins University. He specializes in international politics and security issues.

== Education and positions ==
David earned his B.A. in political science from Union College in 1972. In 1975, he completed his M.A. in East Asian studies from Stanford University, and in 1977 received an M.A. from Harvard University in political science. In 1980, David earned his Ph.D. in political science from Harvard University. He was a post-doctoral fellow in Harvard's National Security Program for the following year.

In 1981, David came to Johns Hopkins University as an assistant professor of political science. In 1987 he became as associate professor, and became a full professor in 1991. From 1983 to 2007, David was director of the International Studies Program at JHU; he held the chair of JHU's political science department. From 1998 to 2003, Steven David was associate dean for academic affairs, and from 2003 to 2004 he served as special assistant to the dean of the Krieger School of Arts and Sciences.

In 2005, David became the vice dean for centers and programs at JHU, providing oversight for ten centers and programs, and in 2007 he became the director of Jewish studies at JHU. David served in that role until 2010, when he was named vice dean for undergraduate education at JHU.

== Teaching philosophy ==
In 1989, David became the first member of the Johns Hopkins faculty to receive the George E. Owen teaching award twice. He won the award for a third time in 1998. In an interview with a university newspaper following his receipt of the award, David said, "I like the students...Someone once asked me, 'Do you want to spend your life with 18- to 22-year-olds?' and I kinda do. They're enthusiastic, they're fun and they're open-minded. I like that."

== Works ==
=== Books ===
- David, Steven (2008). Catastrophic Consequences: Civil Wars and American Interests. Baltimore: Johns Hopkins University Press. ISBN 978-0-8018-8989-9.
- David, Steven (1991). Choosing Sides: Alignment and Realignment in the Third World. Baltimore: Johns Hopkins University Press. ISBN 0-8018-4122-4.
- David, Steven (1987). Third World Coups d'Etat and International Security. Baltimore: Johns Hopkins University Press. ISBN 0-8018-3307-8.

=== Articles and monographs ===
- David, Steven (2008). "Existential Threats to Israel". In Freedman, Robert (ed.). Contemporary Israel: Domestic Politics, Foreign Policy and Security Challenges. Boulder, CO: Westview Press. pp. 299–316. ISBN 978-0-8133-4385-3.
- David, Steven (2007). "On Civil War". The American Interest. II (2): 299–316. Archived from the original on November 30, 2010.
- David, Steven (October 2006). "American Foreign Policy in the Middle East: A Necessary Change?". Israel Affairs. 12 (4): 614–41. doi:10.1080/13537120600889886. S2CID 143948659.
- David, Steven (2003). "If Not Combatants, Certainly Not Civilians". Ethics and International Affairs. 17 (1): 138–40. doi:10.1111/j.1747-7093.2003.tb00424.x. S2CID 143933663.
- David, Steven (2003). "Debate: Israel's Policy of Targeted Killing". Ethics and International Affairs. 17 (1): 111–26. doi:10.1111/j.1747-7093.2003.tb00422.x. S2CID 17694067.
- David, Steven (Spring 2003). "Fatal Choices: Israel's Policy of Targeted Killing". The Review of International Affairs. 2 (3): 135–58.
  - Reprinted in:
  - David, Steven (2003). "Fatal Choices: Israel's Policy of Targeted Killing". In Inbar, Efraim (ed.). Democracies and Small Wars. Portland, OR: Frank Cass. pp. 138–58. ISBN 978-0-7146-8423-9.
  - David, Steven (2007). "Fatal Choices: Israel's Policy of Targeted Killing". In Miller, Rory (ed.). Ireland and the Middle East. Dublin: Irish Academic Press. pp. 113–25. ISBN 978-0-7165-2867-8.
- David, Steven (September 2002). Fatal Choices: Israel's Policy of Targeted Killing (PDF). The Begin Sadat Center for Strategic Studies. doi:10.4324/9780203485422.ch9. Archived from the original (PDF) on November 28, 2009.
- David, Steven (1998). "The Primacy of Internal War". In Neuman, Stephanie (ed.). International Relations Theory and the Third World. New York: St. Martin’s Press. pp. 77–102. ISBN 0-312-17299-0.
- David, Steven (July 1997). "Internal War: Causes and Cures". World Politics. 49 (4): 552–76. doi:10.1017/s0043887100008054. JSTOR 25054019. S2CID 145696937.
- David, Steven (Spring–Summer 1996). "The Continuing Importance of American Interests in the Middle East After the Cold War". Israel Affairs. 2 (3 & 4): 94–106. doi:10.1080/13537129608719395.
- David, Steven (1995). "The Necessity for American Military Intervention in the Post-Cold War World". The United States and the Use of Force in the Post-Cold War Era. Queenstown, MD: The Aspen Institute. pp. 29–70. ISBN 0-89843-163-8.
- David, Steven (1995). "Risky Business: Let Us Not Take a Chance on Proliferation". Security Studies. 4 (4): 773–78. doi:10.1080/09636419509347603.
- David, Steven (Winter 1992–1993). "Why the Third World Still Matters". International Security. 17 (3): 127–59. doi:10.2307/2539132. JSTOR 2539132. S2CID 154116082.
  - Selected for republication in:
  - David, Steven (1992). "Why the Third World Still Matters". In Sean M. Lynn-Jones; Steven E. Miller (eds.). America's Strategy in a Changing World. Cambridge, MA: The MIT Press. pp. 328–60. ISBN 978-0-262-62085-7.
- David, Steven (January 1991). "Explaining Third World Alignment". World Politics. 43 (2): 233–56. doi:10.2307/2010472. JSTOR 2010472. S2CID 154343651.
- David, Steven (Winter 1991). "The Bosom of Abraham: America's Enduring Affection for Israel". Policy Review (55): 57–59.
- David, Steven; Peter Digeser (1990). The United States and the Law of the Sea Treaty. Washington, D.C.: Foreign Policy Institute, SAIS, Johns Hopkins University. ISBN 0-941700-54-2.
- David, Steven (1989). "Why the Third World Matters". International Security. 14 (1): 50–85. doi:10.2307/2538765. JSTOR 2538765.
  - Selected for republication in:
  - David, Steven (1989). "Why the Third World Matters". In Steven E. Miller; Sean M. Lynn-Jones (eds.). Conventional Forces and American Defense Policy. Cambridge, MA: The MIT Press. ISBN 978-0-262-63122-8.
  - Updated version in:
  - David, Steven (1991). "Why the Third World Matters". In Michael Nacht; George Quester; John Weltman (eds.). Challenges to American National Security in the 1990s. New York: Plenum Press. ISBN 0-306-43858-5.
- David, Steven (Summer 1988). "Africa: Moscow's Dubious Investment". The National Interest: 131–38.
- David, Steven (Summer 1986). "Soviet Involvement in Third World Coups". International Security. 11 (1): 131–38. doi:10.2307/2538874. JSTOR 2538874. S2CID 154665017.
  - Updated version selected for publication in:
  - David, Steven (1990). "Soviet Involvement in Third World Coups". In Coli, Alberto (ed.). Secret Warfare and International Order. Washington D.C.: The United States Institute of Peace.
- David, Steven (1986). "The Use of Proxies by Superpowers in Wars of the Third World". In Robert Harkavy; Stephanie Neuman (eds.). The Lessons of Recent Wars in the Third World. Vol. 2. Lexington, MA: Lexington Books. pp. 199–226. ISBN 0-669-09852-3.
- David, Steven (1985). Defending Third World Regimes from Coups d'Etat. Cambridge, MA: Center for International Affairs, Harvard University/University Press of America. ISBN 0-8191-4643-9.
- David, Steven (May–June 1984). "Third World Interventions". Problems of Communism. 33 (3): 65–71.
- David, Steven (Autumn 1982). "Coup and Anti-Coup". The Washington Quarterly. 5 (4): 189–201. doi:10.1080/01636608209450778. S2CID 154380147.
- David, Steven (1982). "The Superpower Competition for Influence in the Third World". In Samuel P. Huntington (ed.). The Strategic Imperative. Cambridge, MA: Ballinger. pp. 229–52. ISBN 978-0-88410-895-5.
- David, Steven (November 1980). "Wielding Alignments: Adjusting to the Reality of the Third World". American Spectator: 18–22.
- David, Steven (Autumn 1979). "Realignment in the Horn: The Soviet Advantage". International Security. 4 (2): 69–90. doi:10.2307/2626744. JSTOR 2626744. S2CID 154991779.

David, Steven. “Explaining Third World Alignment.” World Politics 43, no. 2 (1991). www.jstor.org/stable/2010472.
