= Amos N. Guiora =

Israeli-American professor of law at S

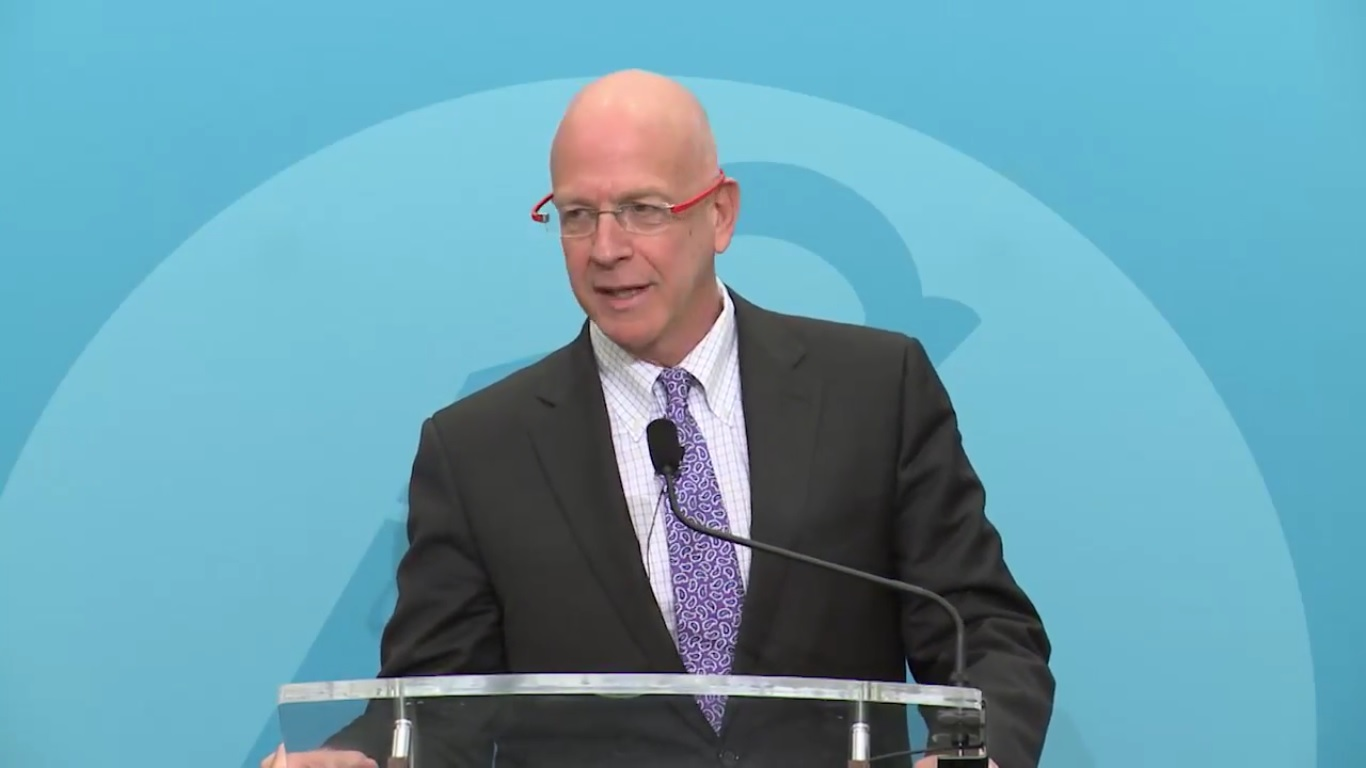
- Born: Amos Neuser Guiora; 1957 (age 68–69); Rehovoth, Israel

Academic background
- Education: Kenyon College (AB); Case Western Reserve University School of Law (JD); Leiden University (PhD)
- Thesis: Tolerating extremism: to what extent should intolerance be tolerated? (2019)
- Doctoral advisor: Paul Cliteur

Academic work
- Institutions: S. J. Quinney College of Law, University of Utah
- Main interests: Institutional complicity, enabling culture, sexual assaults, international law, and morality in armed conflict
- Notable works: Armies of Enablers: Survivor Stories of Complicity and Betrayal in Sexual Assaults (2020)
- Website: University of Utah

Amos Neuser Guiora is an Israeli-American professor of law at S. J. Quinney College of Law, University of Utah, specializing in institutional complicity, enabling culture, and sexual assaults. Guiora’s scholarship explores institutional complicity in relation to the victimization of young people by college sports coaches, trainers, doctors, and Catholic priests. As a result of this work, Guiora has become not just an academic but also an advocate for sexual assault victims.

== Biography ==
Amos Guiora was born in Israel to Hungarian Holocaust survivors. The family moved to Ann Arbor, Michigan before he began school. In 1979, he graduated Kenyon College with honors in history. Prior to attending Case Western Reserve University School of Law, he worked in Washington, D.C., for two years as an assistant to Howard Wolpe and one year for a communications consulting company.

After graduating from Case, Guiora returned to Israel and served in the Israel Defense Forces Judge Advocate General Corps, attaining the rank of lieutenant colonel.

== Academic and legal career ==
Guiora is a Professor of Law at the S.J. Quinney College of Law, the University of Utah. In addition, Professor Guiora is a Distinguished Fellow at The Consortium for the Research and Study of Holocaust and the Law (CRSHL) at Chicago-Kent College of Law and Distinguished Fellow and Counselor, International Center for Conflict Resolution, Katz School of Business, University of Pittsburgh.

Guiora is the Inaugural Chair of the University of Utah Independent Review Committee (Presidential Appointment).

Guiora's most recent book reflects his research on institutional complicity, enabling culture, and sexual assaults. He has spoken at (virtual) conferences in South Africa, the United Kingdom, the Netherlands, and the U.S. on sexual abuse of athletes (Safe Sports) and sexual exploitation of children.

Guiora has published extensively both in the U.S. and Europe on issues related to national security, limits of interrogation, religion and terrorism, the limits of power, multiculturalism, and human rights. He is the author of several books, articles, and book chapters.

His previous scholarship includes (translated into Chinese and Dutch); (co-authored with Professor Paul Cliteur); and (co-authored with Professor Louisa Heiny).

Guiora’s research and book, directly contributed to legislation ratified by the Utah Legislature in 2021 that criminalizes bystanders who do not intervene on behalf of children and vulnerable adults. The legislation, introduced by Rep. Brian King and sponsored by Sen. Kurt Bramble, enjoyed overwhelming bipartisan support.

Guiora has been an expert witness in civil and criminal cases in the U.S. and The Netherlands. In addition, he has testified before the U.S. Senate Judiciary Committee, the U.S. House of Representatives Committee on Homeland Security, the Committee on Foreign Affairs in the Dutch House of Representatives, and the Judiciary Committee of the Utah House of Representatives.

He has also been deeply involved over a number of years in Track Two negotiation efforts regarding the Israeli-Palestinian conflict predicated on a preference and prioritization analytical tool.

He served for 19 years in the Israel Defense Forces as Lieutenant Colonel (retired), and held a number of senior command positions, including Legal Advisor to the Gaza Strip and Commander of the IDF School of Military Law.

Guiora has received grants from both the Stuart Family Foundation and the Earhart Foundation, and was awarded a Senior Specialist Fulbright Fellowship for The Netherlands in 2008. In 2011, he received the S.J. Quinney College of Law Faculty Scholarship Award. In 2015, he was elected a member of the Benchers Society at Case Western Reserve University School of Law.

== Views and opinions ==
Focusing on cases of sexual assault from USA Gymnastics, Michigan State University, Penn State University, Ohio State University, and the Catholic Church, the interviews shed compelling light on two responses: that this question had not been previously asked and that survivor expectation of protection and support from the enabler-bystander was rarely, if ever, met.

Guiora believes the perpetrator benefits from the complicity of the enabler. From the survivor's perspective, both bear responsibility for their plight and must be held accountable. The book emphasizes individual and institutional enablers alike; in fact, armies of enablers. With emotions ranging from deep disappointment to seething anger and extreme frustration, all articulate profound abandonment by the person in a position to assist them in the face of sexual assaults.

Guiora proposes legal, cultural, and social measures aimed at the enabler from the survivor’s perspective. The proposed changes will address, and impact, both broader society and specific communities including higher education, elite athletics, sports organizations, religious institutions, law enforcement, the entertainment industry, and elected officials.

== Published works ==
=== Books ===
- Armies of Enablers: Survivor Stories of Complicity and Betrayal in Sexual Assaults, ABA Publishing, 2020.
- The Crime of Complicity: The Bystander in the Holocaust, ABA Publishing, 2017.
- Guiora, Amos N. (2014). Tolerating Intolerance: The Price of Protecting Extremism. OUP USA. ISBN 9780199331826.
- Homeland Security: What is It and Where Are We Going?, CRC Press/Taylor and Francis Publishers, 2011.
- Global Perspectives on Counterterrorism, 2nd revised and enlarged edition, Aspen Publishers, 2011.
- Counterterrorism Law Across Borders: Differing Perspectives on Rights and Security, with Gregory McNeal, Aspen Publishers, 2010.
- Freedom from Religion: Rights and National Security, Oxford University Press, 2009.
- Annual Review—Top Ten Global Justice Law Review Articles, (General Editor), vol. II, Oxford University Press, 2009.
- Fundamentals of Counterterrorism, Aspen Publishers, 2008.
- Annual Review—Top Ten Global Justice Law Review Articles, (General Editor), vol. I, Oxford University Press, 2008.
- Constitutional Limits on Coercive Interrogation, Oxford University Press, 2008.
- Global Perspectives on Counterterrorism, Aspen Publishers, 2007.

=== Select other publications ===
- Terrorism Primer (Aspen, Fall 2008)
- "Interrogating the Detainees: Extending a Hand or a Boot," University of Michigan Journal of Law Reform
- "Using and Abusing Financial Markets: Money Laundering as the Achilles Heel of Terrorism," co-authored with Brian Field, University of Pennsylvania Journal of International Economics
- "Quirin to Hamdan: Creating a Hybrid Paradigm for Detaining Terrorists," Florida Journal of International Law
- "National Objectives in the Hands of Junior Leaders: IDF Experiences in Combating Terror," co-authored with Martha Minow of Harvard University, in Countering Terrorism in the 21st Century (Praeger Security International, 2007)
- "A Framework for Evaluating Counterterrorism Regulations," with Jerry Ellig and Kyle McKenzie, Mercatus policy series
- "Transnational Comparative Analysis of Balancing Competing Interests in Counterterrorism," Temple International & Comparative Law Journal
- "Where are Terrorists to be Tried: A Comparative Analysis of Rights Granted to Suspected Terrorists," Catholic University Law Review
