= Color-blind casting =

Casting practice in the performing arts

Color-blind casting is the practice of casting roles without regard to the actor's ethnicity or race.

== Terminology ==
Alternative terms and similar practices include non-traditional casting, integrated casting, or blind casting, (Note: "Blind casting" can be shorthand for either color-blind or gender-blind casting) which can involve casting without consideration of skin color, body shape, sex, or gender. A representative of the Actors' Equity Association has disputed the use of "color blind casting", preferring "non-traditional casting". Non-traditional casting "is defined as the casting of ethnic minority actors in roles where race, ethnicity, or gender is not germane".

Blackwashing is the deliberate casting of black actors in non-black historical roles or contexts. Whitewashing is the casting of white actors in non-white roles.

== The Non-Traditional Casting Project ==
The Non-Traditional Casting Project was founded in 1986 to examine problems of racial discrimination in theatre, film and television. The Actors' Equity Association is a co-founder.

== Debate and "color-consciousness" ==
In the theatre community, there is significant debate over the concept of color-blind casting vs "color-conscious casting".

In 1996, Pulitzer-winning playwright August Wilson, who was black, used his Princeton University address on black culture in the United States "The Ground on Which I Stand" to attack the notion of color-blind casting.

"Colorblind casting is an aberrant idea that has never had any validity other than as a tool of Cultural Imperialists who view American culture, rooted in the icons of European culture, as beyond reproach in its perfection ... We do not need colorblind casting; we need theatres." – August Wilson

In 2017, associate editor of American Theatre magazine Diep Tran declared "color-conscious" to be a preferable term. "Color-conscious means we're aware of the historic discrimination in the entertainment industry ... and we're also aware of what it means to put a body of color onstage.". The idea promotes intentionality and race-conscious affirmative action to avoid racially homogeneous casts, and has been supported widely across the theatre community.

In 2018, the Harvard Journal of Sports & Entertainment Law published the article "There's No Business Like Show Business: Abandoning Color-Blind Casting and Embracing Color-Conscious Casting in American Theatre". The article discussed the implications for US employment law and mooted that color-blind casting has not produced its intended result. "Race is still a determining factor in American society, and it is counterintuitive to argue that problems related to race can be fixed by ignoring race altogether". The Broad Online calls a color-blind casting "a superficial solution to a deeper problem."

The 2018 Broadway revival of Carousel sparked further discussion promoting color-conscious casting when Black actor Joshua Henry performed the role of domestic abuser Billy Bigelow alongside white actress Jessie Mueller as Julie Jordan, his partner. Despite a critically acclaimed performance from Henry, many disapproved of the revival's portrayal of a Black man abusing a white woman, which has been historically stereotyped; others questioned the casting of a Black man as an abuser at all. This concern was only exacerbated by a separate discourse surrounding the musical's lack of direct condemnation towards Bigelow's actions, which would fall under heavy scrutiny in the wake of the MeToo movement, as well as the later-proven sexual misconduct allegations levied against cast member Amar Ramasar. When asked if he viewed this version of Billy as a Black man, Henry explained: "I’m playing him as me, who is an African-American man... And sometimes more things are brought to the forefront because I am African-American." Henry went on to state that his casting may benefit future representation for Black performers in classic roles.

Popular shows that employ color-conscious casting include: Hamilton: An American Musical, the BBC's Les Misérables, and the film Mary Queen of Scots (in which the black actor Adrian Lester plays a 16th-century ambassador). In 2017, director Michael Streeter made a color-conscious casting decision for his production of Who's Afraid of Virginia Woolf?, believing "the decision would add depth to the play". Edward Albee's estate denied permission for the production, stating the casting "would fundamentally change the meaning and message of the play".

Historians Zareer Masani and David Abulafia criticized the BBC's use of color-blind casting for the King & Conqueror series, which features a racially diverse cast, including black actors playing roles such as the Mercian nobleman Morcar.

== Examples ==
Production	Year	Description
New York Shakespeare Festival	1955	Joseph Papp started hiring actors of color in his Shakespeare productions.
Tannhäuser	1961	Grace Bumbry was cast as Venus in the Wagner opera, becoming the first African-American singer to perform at the Bayreuth Festival.
Batman	1967	Eartha Kitt was cast as Catwoman in the third season, taking over the role from the white Julie Newmar.
Night of the Living Dead	1968	Duane Jones was cast as Ben, the lead and hero, a role never intended for an African-American.
Never Say Never Again	1983	While a non-Eon-produced James Bond movie, the character of Felix Leiter was portrayed by a black person for the first time, played by Bernie Casey. The idea was to make the role more memorable.
Happily Ever After	1989	Black actress Irene Cara provided the voice of Snow White in Filmation's film Happily Ever After. Her casting was regarded by many (including Cara herself) at the time as strangely "colorblind".
After the Fall	1990	Josette Simon played Maggie at the London National Theatre in 1990. The role is widely supposed to have been based on Arthur Miller's former wife Marilyn Monroe.
The Shawshank Redemption	1994	An adaptation of Rita Hayworth and Shawshank Redemption. The character Red, described as Irish in the novella, is played by Morgan Freeman.
A Midsummer Night's Dream	1995	Staged by the National Asian American Theatre Company, who specialise in creating roles for Asian American actors.
This England: The Histories	2000	British-Nigerian actor David Oyelowo played Henry VI of England. Oyelowo was the first black actor to play an English king in a major production of Shakespeare.
Grey's Anatomy	2005	During the creation of the television series, none of the characters was assigned a race. Color-blind casting was used to choose the best actors for the roles, resulting in an ethnically diverse cast.
Robin Hood	2006	Black British actor David Harewood was cast as Friar Tuck, a character traditionally portrayed as white, overweight, and balding, in "Total Eclipse", the first episode of the third series.
Casino Royale	2006	For the first time in the official James Bond film series (Never Say Never Again was not an Eon-produced entry), the character of Felix Leiter, which had consistently been portrayed as white in the Eon-produced series, was portrayed by black actor Jeffrey Wright. Wright portrays the character again in Quantum of Solace and No Time to Die.
Merlin	2008	Several actors of colour appeared as extras or in more minor roles throughout the series, with Angel Coulby and Tomiwa Edun in recurring roles as Guinevere and Elyan respectively.
King Lear	2010	Black British actress Pippa Bennett-Warner played Cordelia in the 2010 Donmar Warehouse production of King Lear, starring Derek Jacobi in the title role.
Spartacus	2010	Ghanaian-British actor Peter Mensah portrayed the character Oenomaus in the Starz television series Spartacus. The real Oenomaus was a Gallic or Celtic gladiator and one of the original leaders of the slave revolt along with Spartacus and Crixus. In the Spartacus series, Oenomaus is portrayed as a Numidian (North African) gladiator.
Skyfall	2012	The role of Miss Moneypenny, which had previously been cast as white, went to Naomie Harris. She reprised the role in the next James Bond films, Spectre and No Time to Die.
"National Anthem"	2012	John F. Kennedy, who was white, is portrayed by ASAP Rocky in the music video.
The Descendants trilogy	2015	First three films in a major media franchise reimagining the Disney Animated Canon in a 21st-century high school setting. Several characters originally portrayed as white and/or their children are cast color-blind including Cruella de Vil and her son Carlos, The Evil Queen and her daughter Evie, Queen Leah and her granddaughter Audrey, and Lady Tremaine and her granddaughter Dizzy. Other examples include: Jay, son of Jafar, is portrayed by Booboo Stewart. Despite Jafar hailing from a fictional kingdom based on Baghdad, Stewart is of Japanese, Chinese, Korean, Scottish, Russian, and Native American descent.; Ursula is implied to be Black through the casting of China Anne McClain and Dara Reneé as her daughter and younger sister, respectively. Whoopi Goldberg makes an uncredited cameo appearance as Ursula's voice in the second film.
Fantastic Four	2015	Black actor Michael B. Jordan played Human Torch, who is White in the comics, and was played in the 2005 film of the same name by white actor Chris Evans.
Doctor Strange	2016	British-Nigerian actor Chiwetel Ejiofor played Karl Mordo, who is a Transylvanian baron in the comics the film is based on. Likewise, white British actress Tilda Swinton portrays The Ancient One, who is a Tibetan man in the comics.
Harry Potter and the Cursed Child	2016	The stage portrayal of Hermione Granger came under fire due to the casting of Olivier Award-winning actress Noma Dumezweni, a person of South African descent born in Swaziland. Director John Tiffany, playwright Jack Thorne, and franchise creator J.K. Rowling all expressed disgust towards the backlash, with Thorne saying that "what shocked [him] was the way people couldn’t visualise a non-white person as the hero of a story. It’s therefore brilliant that this has happened." Rowling further cited her own books as never describing Hermione's race, as well as fan art frequently depicting the character as Black.
Suicide Squad	2016	Deadshot, a white man in the comics, is portrayed by Will Smith in this movie.
The Girl with All the Gifts	2016	In the British post-apocalyptic zombie horror drama film, based on a M.R. Carey novel of the same name, black actress Sennia Nanua plays main character of Melanie, who is white in the book.
Dynasty	2017	Based on the 1980s series of the same name where both of the lead families are white. In this reboot, the Colby family is portrayed by African-American actors.
Riverdale	2017	Based on the characters and setting of the long-running Archie Comics series, several characters traditionally depicted as white in the comics are portrayed by non-white actors in the series. Most notably, Archie Andrews (the series' lead) is portrayed by KJ Apa, who is of mixed Samoan descent. Veronica Lodge is portrayed by Camila Mendes, who is of Brazilian descent as well as the entire Lodge family has been depicted as being of Latin-American descent in the series. Reggie Mantle is portrayed by Asian-American actors Ross Butler in season 1, and Charles Melton from season 2 onwards, Pop Tate is portrayed by black actor Alvin Sanders and Josie and the Pussycats, a band originally consisting of one black member and two white members in the comics, are converted into an all-black group: Josie and Melody, both previously white, are portrayed by Ashleigh Murray and Hayley Law, respectively.
Spider-Man: Homecoming	2017	Tony Revolori, of Guatemalan heritage, plays Flash Thompson, a white character from the comics previously portrayed in Spider-Man and Spider-Man 3 by Joe Manganiello.
Beauty and the Beast	2017	Gugu Mbatha-Raw plays Plumette, a castle maid who was represented in the 1991 animated film as a white woman. Similarly, Audra McDonald plays Madame de Garderobe, an opera singer who was also white in the animated movie.
The Dark Tower	2017	Black actor Idris Elba plays Roland Deschain, a character who is described in the Dark Tower series as white and is said to have been inspired by white actor Clint Eastwood.
Frozen	2017	Black actor Jelani Alladin plays the character Kristoff, a Scandinavian ice harvester.
Thor: Ragnarok	2017	The role of the bounty hunter Valkyrie, based on the Marvel Comics character commonly depicted as white, is played by biracial actress Tessa Thompson. The role of the Asgardian sentry Heimdall, based on the Marvel Comics character depicted as white (also described in the Scandinavian mythology as "the whitest skinned of all the gods"), was played by Black British actor Idris Elba.
A Series of Unfortunate Events	2017	African-American actor K. Todd Freeman portrayed the character Mr. Poe, who was portrayed by white English actor Timothy Spall in the 2004 film. Indian actor Aasif Mandvi portrayed the character Monty Montgomery who was portrayed by Irish-Scottish actor Billy Connolly in the film. African-American actor Alfre Woodard portrayed the character Aunt Josephine, who was portrayed by white American actress Meryl Streep in the film.
1066: A Year to Conquer England	2017	Jotham Annan plays Norman Robert de Beaumont, 1st Earl of Leicester.
Troy: Fall of a City	2018	The BBC/Netflix co-production, which retells the Iliad, depicts Achilles and Zeus as being black, with the respective roles played by David Gyasi and Hakeem Kae-Kazim.
Deadpool 2	2018	The character Domino, depicted in the comics as an albino white woman with a dark patch of skin in a diamond surrounding her left eye, is portrayed by African-American/German actress Zazie Beetz; the anomalous skin patch was instead lighter than the rest of her complexion. The film also features Māori actor Julian Dennison as Rusty Collins / Firefist, a white Oklahoma native in the comics, and biracial actor Lewis Tan (of partial Chinese descent) as Shatterstar, an extraterrestrial who in the comics has the appearance of a white human.
Fahrenheit 451	2018	The character Guy Montag, who was portrayed by Austrian actor Oskar Werner in the 1966 adaptation, is portrayed by African-American actor Michael B. Jordan. Additionally, the character Clarisse McClellan (portrayed by Julie Christie in the 1966 film) is played by Algerian actress Sofia Boutella.
Titans	2018	Senegalese actress Anna Diop plays the superhero Starfire (Princess Koriand'r). An alien who is drawn in comics with orange or golden skin, Starfire has been previously portrayed by white performers and drawn in animated series with light tan skin, Similarly, the character of Beast Boy is played by Ryan Potter, who is of Japanese descent. This marks the first time in history where a live action superhero team lineup is 50% people of color (the other 50% being Dick Grayson and Rachel Roth, who are portrayed by white Australian actors Brenton Thwaites and Teagan Croft, respectively).
Colette	2018	Saudi actress Aiysha Hart plays the character Polaire. Polaire is a French woman.
Mary Queen of Scots	2018	A British historical drama included Gemma Chan as Elizabeth Hardwick and Adrian Lester as Lord Thomas Randolph.
Les Misérables	2018	British-Nigerian actor David Oyelowo plays inspector Javert, who was described as the son of a French man and a Gypsy woman in the original Victor Hugo novel.
Robin Hood	2018	Jamie Foxx was cast as Little John.
Krypton	2018	Black British actor Colin Salmon was cast as General Zod, who is traditionally portrayed as white.
Mean Girls	2018	Korean-American actress Ashley Park played Gretchen Wieners in the Broadway musical of the same name, who is white in the 2004 film of the same name.
The Witcher	2018	Yennefer is played by half-Indian actress Anya Chalotra, who was a white brunette in the original, similarly done with Vilgefortz (Mahesh Jadu). White character Fringilla Vigo is played by black actress Mimi Ndiweni; Istredd (Royce Pierreson) and Triss Merigold (Anna Shaffer) are also white in books, yet are played by actors of color. The Zerrikanians Tèa and Vèa, who are blonde in the books and based on Scythian warrior women and Greek stories about Amazons, are also played by black actresses.
The Personal History of David Copperfield	2018	Director Armando Iannuci described his approach as colour-blind when casting Dev Patel as Charles Dickens' titular character. Patel described the casting as "representative of a modern Britain – the one that I grew up in". Nigerian actress Nikki Amuka-Bird plays Mrs Steerforth and Benedict Wong plays Mr Wickfield.
Artemis Fowl	2020	In the novel, the character Butler is described as Eurasian, specifically Russian-Japanese; in the film he is portrayed by British Nigerian Nonso Anozie.
Transplant	2020	Pakistani-Canadian actor Hamza Haq portrays Syrian doctor Bashir Hamed.
The Great	2020	Elle Fanning who stars as Catherine the Great in the series spoke of using color-blind casting from the beginning to make "people from now to be able to relate to the show" and "have everyone represented". Sacha Dhawan, a British-Indian actor, plays Count Orlo, and Abraham Popoola plays Rostov.
Bridgerton	2020	The show, crested by Shonda Rhimes, employs many actors of color in positions of nobility that historically were white, most notably Golda Rosheuvel as the queen, Regé-Jean Page as the Duke of Hastings, and Adjoa Andoh as Lady Danbury.
The Witches	2020	Based on the Roald Dahl novel, the main character, a young boy, and his grandmother are black; in the book, they are Anglo-Norwegian.
Enola Holmes	2020	Lestrade, a white man in the original Sherlock Holmes stories by Arthur Conan Doyle, is portrayed by British Indian actor Adeel Akhtar.
Mortal Kombat	2021	Sisi Stringer portrays Mileena, a character who has a pale complexion in the Mortal Kombat games.
Without Remorse	2021	Michael B. Jordan plays John Clark, a fictional character in the Tom Clancy media franchise traditionally portrayed white.
Anne Boleyn	2021	Jodie Turner-Smith plays Anne Boleyn.
The Green Knight	2021	Dev Patel plays Gawain, a fictional character in the King Arthur legend traditionally portrayed white.
Cruella	2021	Kirby Howell-Baptiste portrays the character Anita Darling, who is white in all previous iterations of 101 Dalmatians.
Spider-Man: No Way Home	2021	Jamie Foxx reprises his role as the supervillain Electro, who is white in the comics.
Cowboy Bebop	2021	The live-action TV series based on the original 1997 Japanese anime has Mustafa Shakir portraying the character of Jet Black, who is presumed white, and Daniella Pineda, a Mexican-American actor as Faye Valentine, who is Singaporean in the anime.
Resident Evil: Welcome to Raccoon City	2021	A film based on the first two games of the Japanese video game series Resident Evil, biracial actor Avan Jogia portrays the characters Leon Kennedy, who is white in the video game series and was portrayed by white actor Johann Urb, in the original film series. Biracial actor Hannah John-Kamen portrays Jill Valentine, who is white in the video game series.
The Electrical Life of Louis Wain	2021	British actor Richard Ayoade, the son of a Nigerian father and a Norwegian mother, plays Henry Wood.
Venom: Let There Be Carnage	2021	Black actor Naomie Harris plays the character Shriek, who is white in the comics.
The Tragedy of Macbeth	2021	Black actors Denzel Washington and Corey Hawkins play Lord Macbeth and Macduff, respectively.
The Irregulars	2022	Black actor Royce Pierreson played Doctor John Watson.
The Batman	2022	Jeffrey Wright portrays the usually white American Commissioner Gordon and Zoe Kravitz plays Catwoman, a role she reprised from 2017's The Lego Batman Movie.
Matilda the Musical	2022	Lashana Lynch, portrays Miss Honey, who is white in 1988 novel, 1996 film adaptation, and the musical adaptation.
Halo	2022	Shabana Azmi, an Indian actress, portrays Admiral Margaret Parangosky.
Enola Holmes 2	2022	Professor Moriarty, a white man in the original Sherlock Holmes stories by Arthur Conan Doyle, is portrayed by Sharon Duncan-Brewster, who is a Black British woman.
The Little Mermaid	2023	Black singer/actress Halle Bailey portrays Ariel, originally described as white in Hans Christian Andersen's "The Little Mermaid" and in the 1989 Disney adaptation. Rob Marshall, the director, said she was cast because "she possesses that rare combination of spirit, heart, youth, innocence, and substance — plus a glorious singing voice — all intrinsic qualities necessary to play this iconic role". Bailey's casting would inspire the 2024 Disney Junior cartoon Ariel, which portrays Ariel, King Triton, and Ursula as Black. In the film, Ariel's sisters are cast color-blind; however, according to the film's tie-in book The Little Mermaid: Guide to Merfolk, Ariel's sisters in the film are representative of the Seven Seas. This has led to an interpretation that the diverse casting of Ariel's sisters is color-conscious casting meant to connect each daughter to the population they would preside over.
The Flash	2023	Colombian actress Sasha Calle portrays Supergirl; she is the first Latina to portray the character.
Doctor Who	2023	Nathaniel Curtis, a half-Indian actor, plays Isaac Newton.
Percy Jackson and the Olympians	2023	Black actress Leah Jeffries portrays the character Annabeth Chase, daughter of the Greek goddess Athena, who was described as grey-eyed, blonde-haired white in the books, and played by Alexandra Daddario in the film adaptation.
Queen Cleopatra	2023	Black actress Adele James was cast in the titular role of Cleopatra in the 2023 Netflix docuseries. The announcement drew backlash from Egyptian authorities who said Cleopatra's features were light-skinned and Hellenistic.
Titanic	2023 – 2024	A 2023 UK tour had black actress Bree Smith playing Alice Beane (based on Ethel Beane). One reviewer praised Smith's performance but felt it an "odd choice made by the casting team...I couldn't help but initially think that in an authentic setting, a black woman would not be fangirling over people who most likely wouldn't treat her very well. The choice doesn't hurt (but) it can pull you out of the experience if you think too long about the era's politics that wouldn't have stopped [at] the gangplank." (Note: The Laroche family, father Joseph and daughters Simonne and Louise, were the only known passengers of black ancestry on board the ship in real life.) A 2024 Off-Broadway concert as part of the Encores! series, will have Chuck Cooper portray Captain E. J. Smith and Iranian Ramin Karimloo as Frederick Barrett.
Mean Girls	2024	Karen, Janis Ian, and Damian are respectively portrayed by Avantika, Auliʻi Cravalho, and Jaquel Spivey, who are respectively of Indian, Native Hawaiian, and black descent. All three characters were depicted as white in the 2004 film and the musical adaptation.
A Gentleman in Moscow	2024	The 2024 TV adaptation of A Gentleman in Moscow uses color-blind casting, featuring black actors in significant roles, such as British-Nigerian actor Fehinti Balogun as a Russian revolutionary.
Descendants: The Rise of Red	2024	Continuation of the major media franchise reimagining the Disney Animated Canon in a 21st-century high school setting. Examples include: Red, the daughter of the Queen of Hearts, is portrayed by Kylie Cantrall.; Leonardo Nam portrays Maddox Hatter, son of the Mad Hatter.; Brandy and Paolo Montalban return as Cinderella and Prince Charming from their own color-blind performances as the characters in 1997, where Filipino actor Montalban portrayed the son of a white father and Black mother. Cinderella and Charming's son, who was introduced as a character several installments prior to their casting, was cast with white actor Jedidiah Goodacre to reflect the original animated film. Their daughter is portrayed by Malia Baker.; Sam Morelos portrays Meadow, a background character seen in the past. Originally conceived as Zellie, the daughter of Rapunzel and Flynn Rider, her presence was cut down significantly due to time constraints.
Gladiator II	2024	Denzel Washington portrays Macrinus in Gladiator II. Although the film portrays the character as a black man, historical accounts identify Macrinus as a North African Berber of Mediterranean descent. Washington acknowledged this difference in interviews, noting that his portrayal did not strictly follow the historical figure's appearance. The Roman co-emperors Caracalla and Geta were largely of Arab and North African descent, but the actors who played them are not.
Snow White	2025	Rachel Zegler, a half-Colombian actress, plays as Snow White.
How to Train Your Dragon	2025	In the fantasy remake of the 2010 film How to Train Your Dragon, Nico Parker, a half-Zimbabwean actress, portrays the Viking Astrid Hofferson, who is of white descent.
King & Conqueror	2025	The BBC drama series King & Conqueror, focusing on the 1066 Norman Conquest, features color-blind casting, with non-white actors cast as Anglo-Saxon nobles.
Robin Hood	2025	Marcus Fraser was cast as Little John.
Harry Potter (television series)	2026	Paapa Essiedu, a Black actor, is cast as Severus Snape—a character described as having 'pale skin' and a 'hooked nose' in the Harry Potter series of novels. The Express Tribune published a critique titled "A black Snape is a bad idea" arguing that the casting of Paapa Essiedu deviates significantly from the source material and introduces problematic narrative implications.
Enola Holmes 3	2026	Dr. Watson, a white man in the original Sherlock Holmes stories by Arthur Conan Doyle, is portrayed by Himesh Patel, a British Indian actor.
The Odyssey	2026	Despite the film's mythological setting and tone, non-white actors such as Travis Scott, Zendaya, and Lupita Nyong'o faced severe internet backlash from right-wing commentators and netizens for being cast in the Christopher Nolan film adaptation of the poem prior to its release. Outside of race-related complaints, transgender actor Elliot Page also received backlash, especially after being incorrectly described as playing Achilles. (Page portrayed Sinon, a character from Virgil's Aeneid.) Nolan publicly dismissed these complaints, describing them as "always irrelevant, because no one having them knows what the film actually is yet." Despite the film's critical and commercial success, right-wing voices such as Elon Musk continued to perpetuate these ideas in online spaces such as Musk's X, with Musk announcing he would produce an AI-generated "historically accurate" version of the film by the end of 2026.
Descendants: Wicked Wonderland	2026	Sequel to Descendants spin-off film The Rise of Red; continuation of the major media franchise reimagining the Disney Animated Canon in a 21st-century high school setting. Examples include: Pink, the younger daughter of the Queen of Hearts who was accidentally created as a result of time travel, is portrayed by Liamani.; Max Hatter, grandson of the Mad Hatter and son of Leonardo Nam's Maddox Hatter, is portrayed by Brendon Tremblay, an actor of Chinese descent.; Hazel, daughter of Captain Hook, is portrayed by Colombian-Puerto Rican actress Kiara Romero. Her brother from previous installments, Harry, is portrayed by white Scottish actor Thomas Doherty. A young version of Hook is portrayed by white American actor Joshua Colley.
Game of Thrones: The Mad King	2026	Stage play prequel to the A Song of Ice and Fire book series, taking place ten years prior and featuring several major characters, almost all of whom were previously depicted as white in television adaptation Game of Thrones. Several roles in the show's opening company have been cast color-blind, with characters from House Stark and House Martell primarily portrayed by Black actors.
Hidden Heroes: A Descendants Story	2027	Spin-off of the major media franchise reimagining the Disney Animated Canon in a 21st-century high school setting. Examples include: Incan villain Yzma is portrayed by Chinese-American actress Sherry Cola. Her daughter Zara is portrayed by Momona Tamada, an actress of Japanese descent.; Siblings Connor and Kyra Wong, who are of Chinese descent, portray children of Mrs. Potts alongside white actor Rhys Dawkins.; James Monroe Iglehart reprises his Tony-winning role from the Broadway musical adaptation of Aladdin as the Genie. The role was originally portrayed by white actor Robin Williams, despite Iglehart's casting better reflecting the character's implied origins. Genie would also be depicted by a Black man in the animated film's 2019 live-action remake, where he was portrayed by Will Smith.

== See also ==
- Bona fide occupational qualification
- Racebending
- Race-reversed casting
- Tokenism
- Whitewashing in film
