= Racebending =

Cultural appropriation

Racebending is the casting of actors in live-action films to play a character that is a different race from them. The term was coined as a protest in 2009 as a response to the casting decisions for the live-action film adaptation of the television series Avatar: The Last Airbender. The starring roles of the show (Aang, Katara, and Sokka) were coded as being of East Asian (Aang) and Inuit (Katara and Sokka) descent, but were played by actors of European descent in the film. The initial protests such as "Saving the World with Postage," were created in a LiveJournal online forum that initially responded to the casting decisions by "inundating Paramount with protest mail." However, the cast went unaltered and when production began, the leaders of this protest responded by founding the advocacy group and accompanying website Racebending by "playfully borrowing the concept of manipulating elements (bending) from the Avatar universe."

According to Christopher Campbell, whitewashing in film is particularly common and "possesses a long tradition among the industry's most successful and venerated productions. Film history is replete with ignominious examples of white actors portraying characters of color."

== Causes ==
In the United States entertainment industry, Christina Shu Jien Chong has stated that racebending, whitewashing and an overall lack of representation of Asian Americans, as well as other minorities in the film industry, is not due to lack of minority applicants, but instead due to lack of opportunities for minorities due to a connection-based culture in the entertainment industry created through implicit bias, and breakdowns, casting descriptions that usually include characteristics including a characters name, gender, age, race, minor personality traits and a brief life background. Chong does not consider breakdowns problematic in themselves, but as stated by Russell Robinson in a research article published by the Berkeley Law Scholarship Repository, they tend to discriminate against minorities in the entertainment industry. Part of Robinson's argument against breakdowns is that they are usually created by studio directors and 87% of directors are white. Robinson claims that these directors and others within the film industry can easily decide to change the race of a breakdown or of a character being adapted from another form of media. Robinson stated, "Any person in this decision-making chain might exclude an actor or an entire category of actors based on race or sex-based considerations, yet this discrimination would normally remain concealed from the excluded applicants and the public." According to Robinson, there are circles of "the wealthy elite in Hollywood" whose "implicit biases", covered up by breakdowns, lead to a significant amount of racebending and whitewashing within the film industry.

Many producers and directors in the film industry believe that it is not racial discrimination that leads to racebending, whitewashing, and an overall lack of minority representation in the film industry. Instead, many credit it to a low number of minority applicants and the lack of funding they would receive if they did cast minorities in lead roles. In response to critic backlash after the release of the film 21, which is based on the true story of a group of Asian American students who in the film are portrayed mostly by Caucasian actors, producer Dana Brunetti claimed, "We would have loved to cast Asians in the lead roles, but the truth is, we didn't have access to any bankable Asian-American actors that we wanted." Furthermore, Ridley Scott claimed, after the release of his film Exodus: Gods and Kings, which faced a similar whitewashing controversy, "I can't mount a film of this budget, where I have to rely on tax rebates in Spain and say that my lead actor is Muhammad so-and-so from such-and-such. I'm just not going to get it financed. So the question doesn't even come up."

== Examples ==
The film Exodus: Gods and Kings received significant backlash on social media before its release due to white actors Christian Bale, Joel Edgerton and others being cast to play the roles of Egyptians. In contrast, black actors were only given the roles of slaves and thieves. Director Ridley Scott argued that they cast actors of other ethnicities as well (Iranians, Spaniards, Arabs, etc.) because Egyptians have varied ethnicities, and that the audience should not focus on only the white actors.

=== The Last Airbender ===
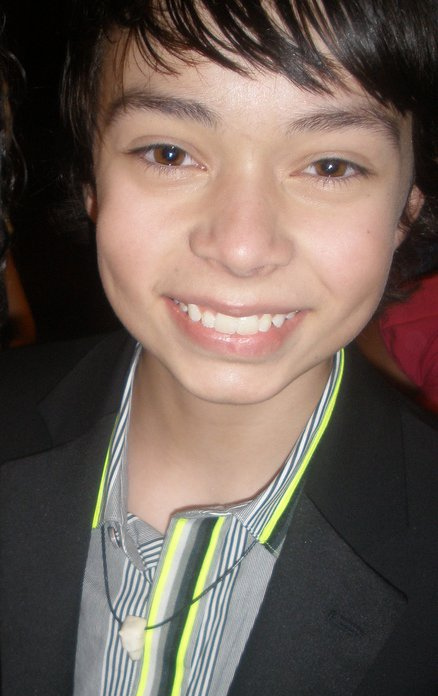
Ringer at the 2010 New York City premiere of The Last Airbender

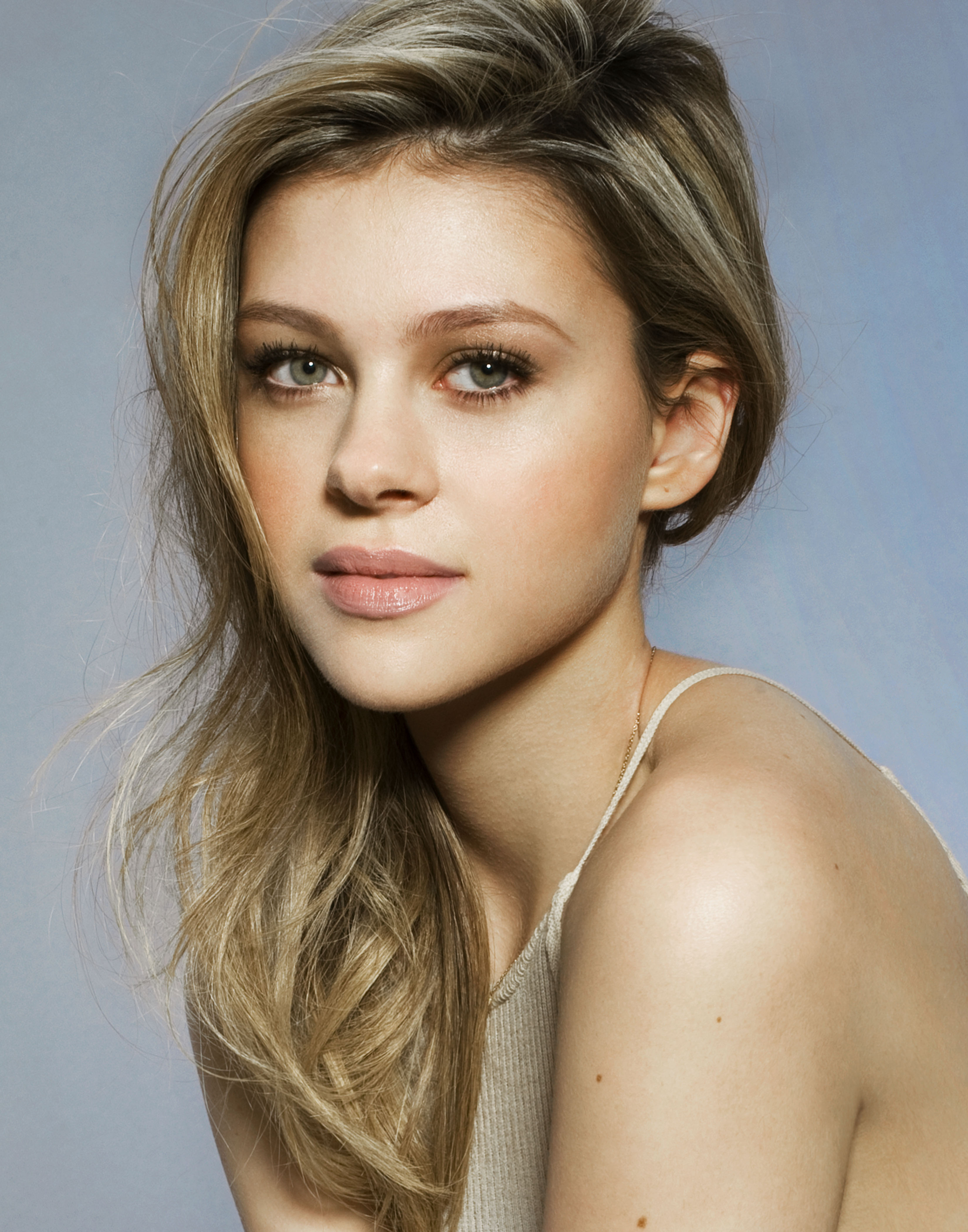
Nicola Peltz in 2015

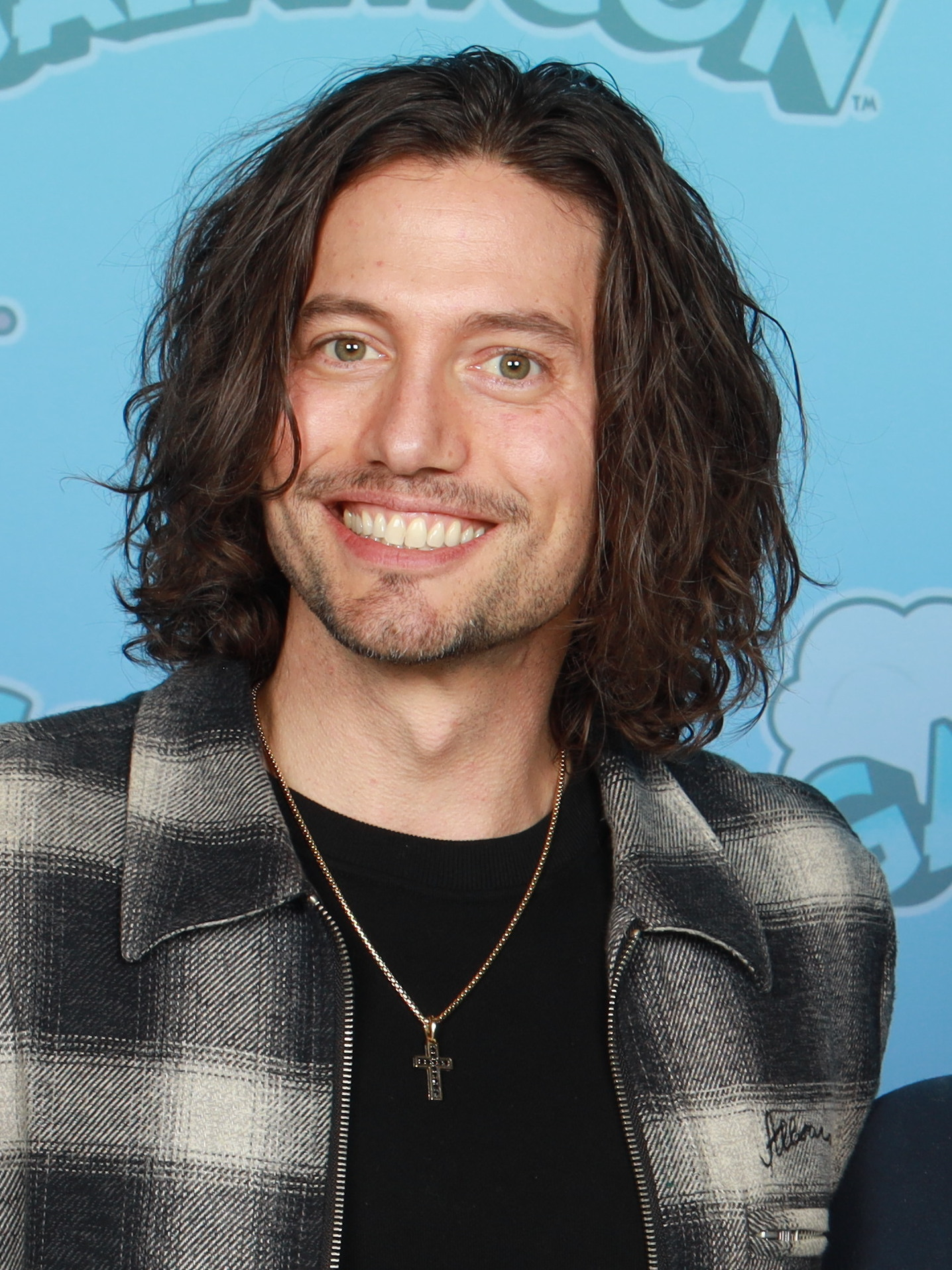
Jackson Rathbone in 2025

After the producers of The Last Airbender announced their decision to cast white actors Noah Ringer, Nicola Peltz and Jackson Rathbone as the lead roles, the artists who had worked on the animated series it was based on created an anonymous LiveJournal website and started a letter-writing campaign. On the other hand, the actors portraying the antagonist characters are mainly Middle Eastern and Indian.

In 2010, Racebending.com and the Media Action Network for Asian Americans, alongside urging boycotts of The Last Airbender, also urged boycotts of Prince of Persia: The Sands of Time as well, due to practices of racebending. Prince of Persia was criticized for casting white actors for the leads instead of actors of Iranian or Middle Eastern descent.

=== Ghost in the Shell ===
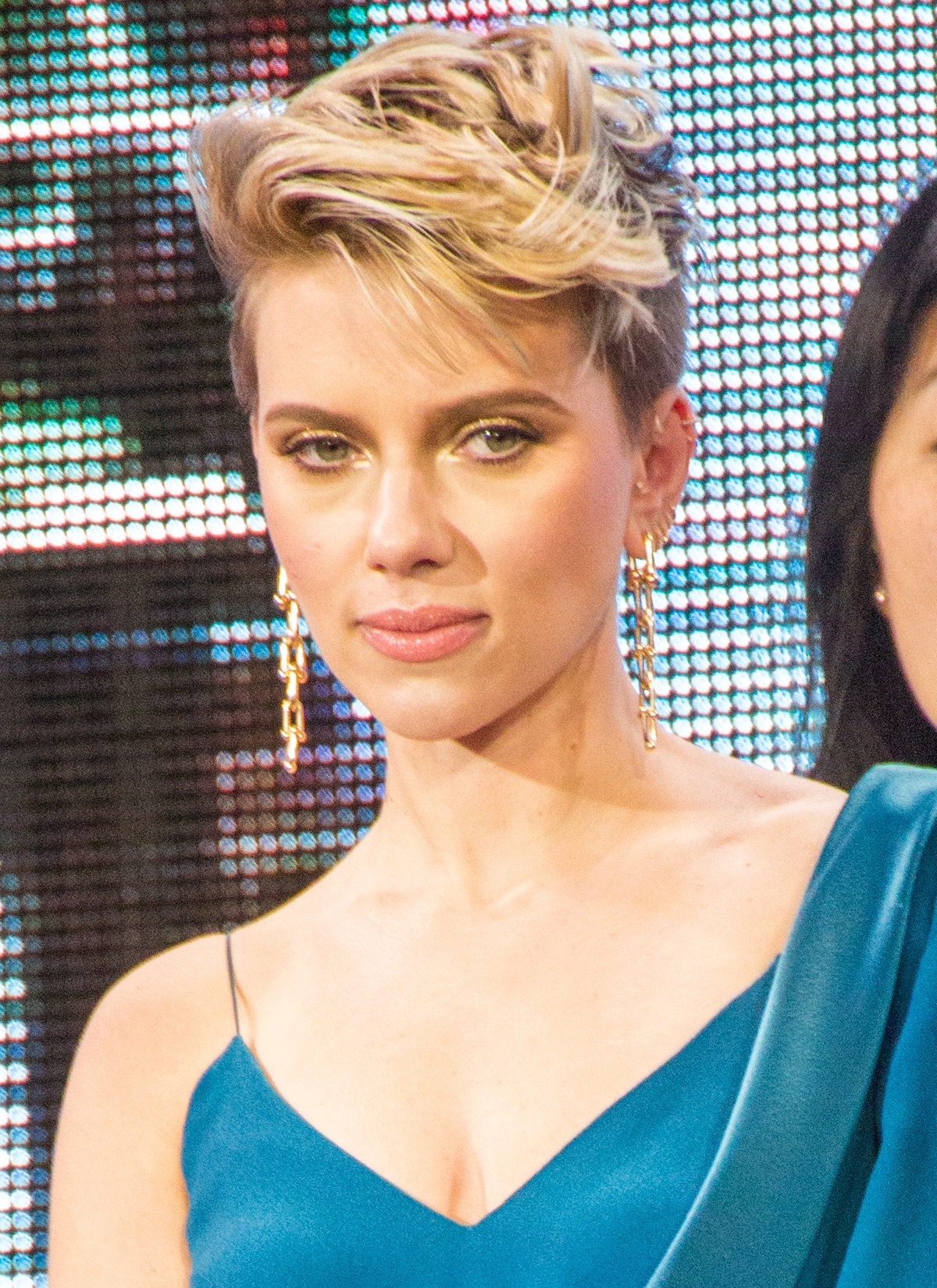
Scarlett Johansson at the 2017 premiere of Ghost in the Shell, in which she played the lead character thought of as ethnically Japanese

When Scarlett Johansson was cast in the lead role of Motoko Kusanagi in Ghost in the Shell, a live-action adaptation of the Japanese manga, there was fan backlash over the casting as, since the story is located within Japan, it was assumed that the actress to portray the character was meant to be of Japanese descent. Numerous fans signed petitions for a recast. Johansson addressed the issue in an interview with Marie Claire, stating that she never would have accepted the role if it meant taking it from an Asian actor. Johansson explained how she accepted the part because the main protagonist was female and "having a franchise with a female protagonist driving it is such a rare opportunity."

Activist groups, such as the Media Action Network for Asian Americans (MANAA) accused Johansson of lying that she would never portray or attempt to play someone of a different race. Their complaints stemmed from the idea that they believed Hollywood was not allowing Asians to portray Asian characters, and instead, was hiring white actors to take roles that could easily have been portrayed by an Asian actor and actress. Asian actors such as Constance Wu and Ming-Na Wen called for a boycott of the film because they thought it was unfair that the role did not go to an Asian woman.

The Founding President of MANAA, Guy Aoki, stated, "Hollywood continues to make the same excuses, that there aren't big enough Asian/Asian American names to open a blockbuster film. Yet it has not developed a farm system where such actors get even third billing in most pictures. Without a conscientious effort, how will anyone ever break through and become familiar enough with audiences so producers will confidently allow them to topline a film? When will we ever break that glass ceiling?"

In contrast to the controversy, Mamoru Oshii, director of the 1995 anime film, defended Johansson's casting and even cited the casting being in line with the themes, story, and source material of the book, specifically saying "The Major is a cyborg and her physical form is an entirely assumed one. The name 'Motoko Kusanagi' and her current body are not her original name and body, so there is no basis for saying that an Asian actress must portray her...I believe having Scarlett play Motoko was the best possible casting for this movie. I can only sense a political motive from the people opposing it, and I believe artistic expression must be free from politics."

=== Harry Potter play and TV show ===
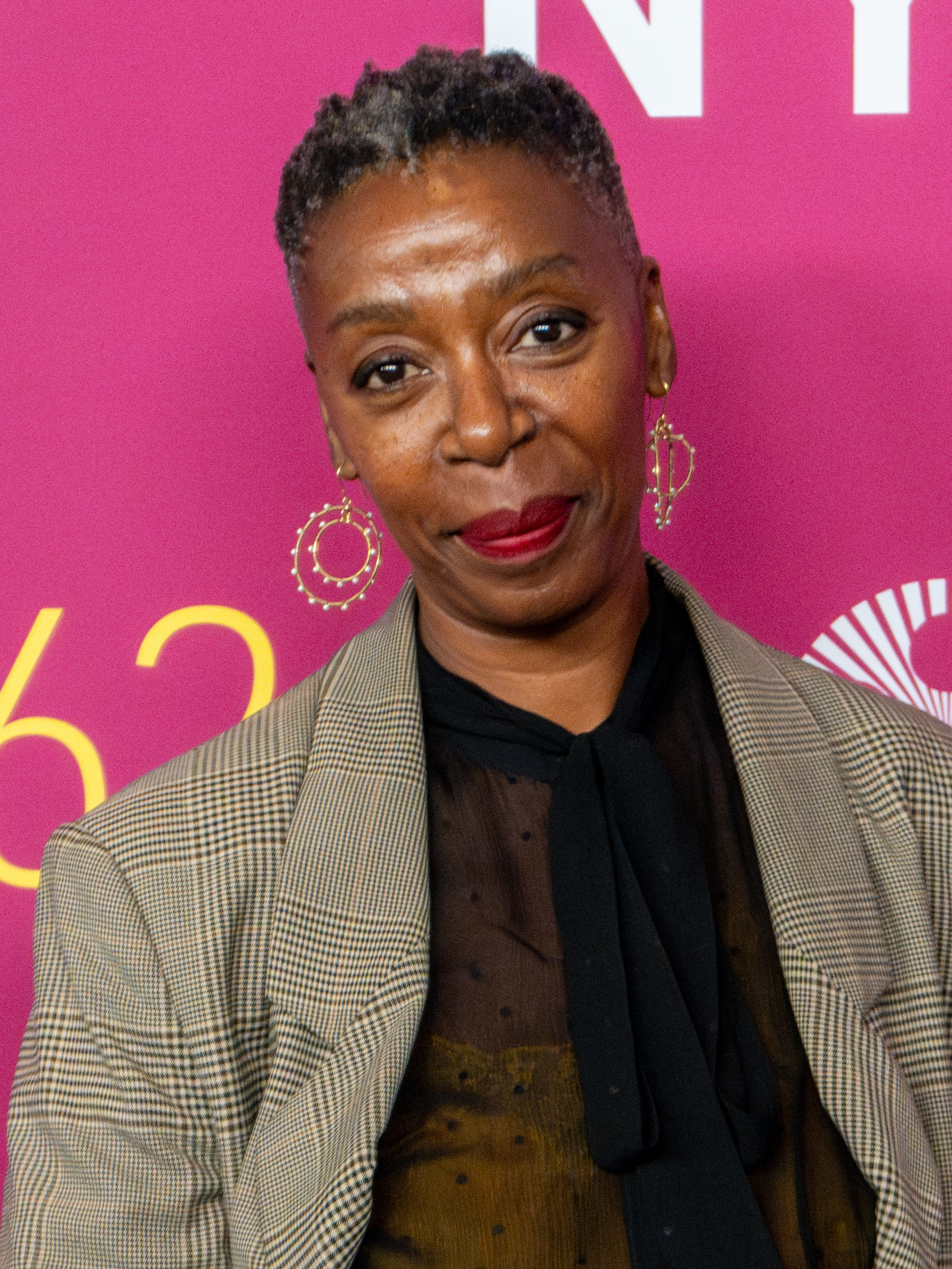
Noma Dumezweni, who played Hermione Granger in the play Harry Potter and the Cursed Child, pictured at the 2024 New York Film Festival.

Conversely, when Harry Potter received an addition to its installment with the stage play Harry Potter and the Cursed Child, it was announced that the character Hermione Granger would be played by Noma Dumezweni, an African actress residing in England. Fans were displeased with this and called it "blackwashing", citing the books' prior mention of Hermione's skin tone, but J. K. Rowling, the author of the original book series, stated that white skin was never specified in the making of Hermione and that "Hermione can be a black woman with my absolute blessing and enthusiasm."

In 2025, for the upcoming TV series adaptation of the novels, the casting of Paapa Essiedu as Severus Snape, has led to a controversy and significant debate about racebending, with fans noting the description of the character being understood as white and having "sallow skin", leading to the actor, as of March 2026 receiving death threats. Rowling said on the matter "I don’t have the power to sack an actor from the series and I wouldn’t exercise it if I did." Harry Potter actor, Jason Isaacs, who played Lucius Malfoy, called out the fans who were displeased by Essiedu's casting, citing racism, and that performance matters more than appearance.

=== Other black actors cast as other races ===
Another example of racebending occurred when Jodie Turner-Smith, who is a black woman, was cast to play Anne Boleyn, the second wife of Henry VIII and a white woman. Netflix's docuseries "Queen Cleopatra" provoked controversy after casting black actress Adele James as the titular character and portraying Egypt's Ptolemaic Dynasty, a Macedonian family, as black Africans. Netflix has similarly cast black actor Denzel Washington (aged 68) in an upcoming biopic of Carthaginian general Hannibal Barca, who was 26 years old at the beginning of the Second Punic War, and likely of Semitic Phoenician descent.

== Other uses ==
Usage evolved, and by 2015, media studies academic Kristen J. Warner wrote that the term has "many definitions and contexts", from the film industry practice of color-blind casting to fan fiction. She describes how writers can "change the race and cultural specificity of central characters or pull a secondary character of color from the margins, transforming her into the central protagonist."

Paste's Abbey White said in 2016 that the term can apply to actors of color being cast in traditionally white roles. White said, "In the last several years, racebending has become a practice used more and more to help networks diversify their ensembles and capture a bigger audience. Not only has it resulted in more racial visibility on the small screen, but in a far more unexpected way, racebending can generate deeper and more significant depictions of characters."

== Statistics ==
According to a 2016 University of Southern California report on diversity in entertainment within which 414 stories were sampled, 109 motion pictures and 305 broadcast, cable and digital series, "71.7% were white, 12.2% Black, 5.8% Hispanic/Latino, 5.1% Asian, 2.3% Middle Eastern and 3.1% other", in contrast to the United States Census Bureau's population estimates for July 2016 being "63.3% White, 12.6% Black, 16.2% Hispanic/Latino, 4.9% Asian, 2.1% mixed, 1.0% other."

The University of Southern California report noted that it sampled all "independent speaking character utters one or more discernible and overt words (of any language) on screen. Nonverbal utterances are not considered words. Characters that are named are also considered speaking characters. Under rare circumstances, a group of nearly identical characters might speak at the same time or sequentially. Given their extremely homogeneous appearance, it is impossible to distinguish these characters from one another. When this occurs, the coders are instructed to "group" the identical characters and code them as one unit."

According to Christina Shu Jien Chong's article in the Asian Pacific American Law Journal, "Whites occupied 83.5% of lead roles while minorities occupied 16.5%; 9.5% Black, 2% Latino, 2.5% Asian, 0.5% Native American, and 2% Mixed/Other." According to Chong, when it comes to casting for major roles, racebending, whitewashing and implicit bias lead to an even more drastic underrepresentation of minorities in the entertainment industry.

== See also ==
- Blackface and blackface in contemporary art
- Redface
- Yellowface and examples of Yellowface
- Color-blind casting
- Whitewashing in film
- Hamilton (musical)

== Bibliography ==
- Chu, Monica (2015). "From Fan Activism to Graphic Narrative". Drawing New Color Lines: Transnational Asian American Graphic Narratives. Hong Kong University Press. ISBN 978-988-8139-38-5.
- Hart, William (2015). "Racebending: Race, Adaptation, and the Films I, Robot and I Am Legend". In Kapell, Matthew Wilhelm; Pilkington, Ace G. (eds.). The Fantastic Made Visible Essays on the Adaptation of Science Fiction and Fantasy from Page to Screen. McFarland. pp. 207–222. ISBN 978-0-7864-9619-8.
- Warner, Kristen J. (2015). "ABC's Scandal and Black Women's Fandom". In Levine, Elana (ed.). Cupcakes, Pinterest, and Ladyporn: Feminized Popular Culture in the Early Twenty-First Century. Feminist Media Studies. University of Illinois Press. pp. 32–50. ISBN 978-0-252-08108-8.
- Young, Helen (2015). Race and Popular Fantasy Literature: Habits of Whiteness. Routledge Interdisciplinary Perspectives on Literature. Routledge. ISBN 978-1-138-85023-1.
- Smith, Stacy L., et al. INCLUSION or INVISIBILITY? Comprehensive Annenberg Report on Diversity in Entertainment. USC Annenberg School for Communication and Journalism, 2016, INCLUSION or INVISIBILITY? Comprehensive Annenberg Report on Diversity in Entertainment.
- Chong, Christina, Where are the Asians in Hollywood? Can §1981, Title VII, Colorblind Pitches, and Understanding Biases Break the Bamboo Ceiling? (August 23, 2016). Asian Pacific American Law Journal, Vol. 21, issue 1, p. 29-79 (2016); Univ. of San Francisco Law Research Paper No. 2016-18. Available at SSRN: https://ssrn.com/abstract=2828261
- Russell K. Robinson, Casting and Caste-ing: Reconciling Artistic Freedom and Antidiscrimination Norms, 95 Cal. L. Rev. (2007)
- “Race and Ethnicity in the United States.” Race and Ethnicity in the United States - Statistical Atlas, statisticalatlas.com/United-States/Race-and-Ethnicity.
