= Tina Gharavi =

British film director, screenwriter, and producer (born 1972)

- تینا غروی
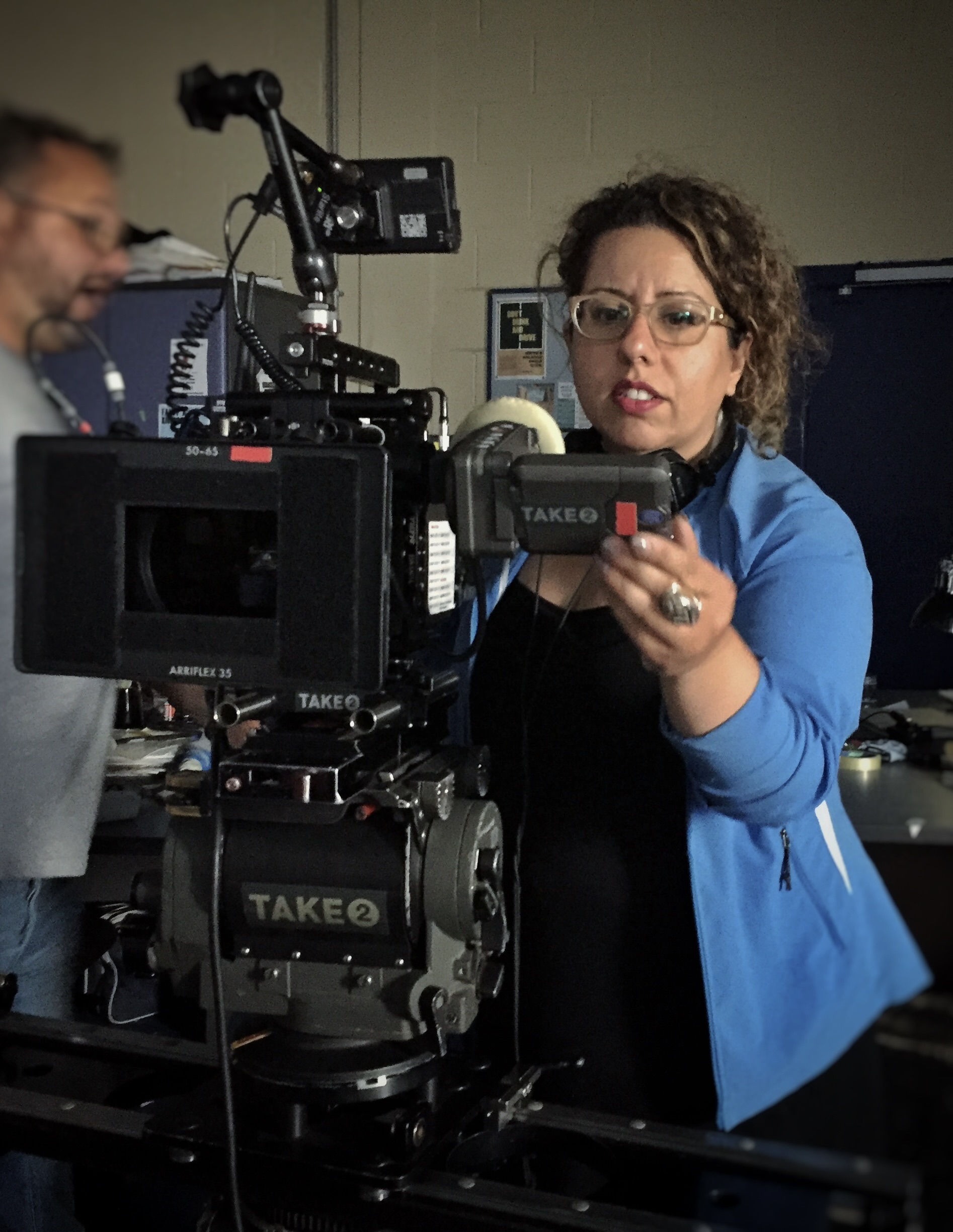
- Gharavi on the set of TV series The Tunnel
- Born: 1 July 1972 (age 54); Tehran, Imperial State of Iran
- Occupations: Artist, director, screenwriter, professor
- Years active: 1998–present
- Website: Official website

Tina Gharavi (Persian: تینا غروی; born 1 July 1972) is an Iranian-born British film director, screenwriter, artist and academic based in Paris and Newcastle upon Tyne.

== Early life and education ==
Gharavi was born in Tehran, Iran. She attended high school in Middletown, New Jersey. She initially trained as a painter in the United States before an on-set experience for a Hollywood production prompted her to pursue a career in the film industry. She later studied near Lille in northern France at Le Fresnoy, studio national des arts contemporains.

== Career ==
In 1998, Gharavi established the film company Bridge +Tunnel Productions, a film production company which has produced projects across documentary, television, and narrative fiction film.

Her directorial debut, Closer, is a 35mm experimental documentary which premiered at Sundance 2001 won the PlantOut Grand Prize at Outfest in LA. Her following documentary, Mother/Country, which chronicled her return to her mother’s house in Iran 23 years after the Islamic Revolution, was broadcast in the UK on Channel Four TV.

Her debut feature film, I Am Nasrine, was released in 2013. It was nominated for a BAFTA for outstanding debut. Sir Ben Kingsley called it "an important and much-needed film". Peter Bradshaw of The Guardian gave the film four stars, writing that it was "a valuable debut, shot with a fluent kind of poetry".

In April 2023, Gharavi addressed criticism regarding the casting of mix-race actress Adele James as Cleopatra in the Netflix series Queen Cleopatra, which she directed, distributed by Netflix and produced by Jada Pinkettt Smith's Westbrook Studios. In December of that year, Gharavi was announced as the showrunner for The Fox, an international crime thriller series based on the bestselling Icelandic detective novels by Sólveig Pálsdóttir.

In 2026, Gharavi's adaptation of Virginia Woolf's 1919 novel Night and Day was released, starring Haley Bennett, Timothy Spall, Jennifer Saunders and Jack Whitehall. Peter Bradshaw gave the film four out of five stars in The Guardian, saying “It is such a sweet story and guilelessly eccentric – a butterfly fluttering just beyond the wheel of realism.” while Screen International described Bennett's performance as a strength of the adaptation.

Gharavi is a Reader in Film & Digital Media at the University of Newcastle, where she also completed her PhD, Narrative Cannibals: Whose Story Is It Anyway? The Politics of Representation and the Veracity of the Image in the Age of Digital Storytelling. She was invited to join the BAFTA Academy in 2017 and received a Fellowship from the MIT Documentary Lab in Boston, She is working on her next feature projects, The Good Iranian, in collaboration with Film4 and Forough: Let Us Believe In The Beginning of The Cold Season, a film about Iranian poet, Forugh Farrokhzad, a film developed with the BFI and executive produced by Wes Anderson.

== Selected filmography ==
=== Film ===
Year	Title	Role	Notes
2001	Closer	Director/Producer	Sundance prmiere
2002	A Town Like Lackawanna	Director/Producer/Camera	NEA residency Hallwalls
2004	Featherhead	Director/Producer	Short film
2006	Bread: Nearest Neighbor: Israel & Palestine	Director/Producer	Documentary installation
2007	Asylum Carwash	Director/Producer	Documentary installation
2007	Two Lighthouses	Director/Producer	Poetry film
2007–2013	Last of the Dictionary Men	Artist	Documentary installation
2008	The King of South Shields	Director/Producer	Documentary
2013	I Am Nasrine	Director/Producer/Screenwriter	BAFTA-nomination feature film
2015	People Like Us	Director/Producer/Screenwriter	Documentary short
2020	Tribalism Is Killing Us	Director/Producer	Documentary
2026	Shadows of Beirut [AKA A Beirut Love Story]	Director/Screenwriter	Feature film
2026	Virginia Woolf's Night and Day	Director	Feature film
2027	Häxan	Director	Feature film
TBA	The Good Iranian	Director/Producer/Screenwriter	Feature film
TBA	Forough: Let Us Believe in the Beginning of The Cold Season	Director/Producer/Screenwriter	Feature film

=== Television ===
Year	Title	Role	Notes -
2002	Mother/Country [Channel Four TV, UK]	Director/Producer	Channel Four TV (UK) and Sundance Channel
2017	The Tunnel: Vengeance [Sky TV]	Second unit director	Sky TV (UK)
2018	Ackley Bridge [Channel Four TV, UK]	Director	Channel Four TV: Episodes 5, 6
2023	African Queens: Queen Cleopatra [Netflix]	Director	Netflix: Episodes 1-4
TBA	Refurinn/The Fox	Showrunner / Director	Commissioned by Gaumont (Fr) and Icelandic broadcaster Simmins
