= Adesuwa (disambiguation) =

Adesuwa may refer to:

- Adesuwa, a 2012 Nigerian film
- Adesuwa Oni (born 1989), British actress
- Adesua Etomi (born 1988), Nigerian actress
