= David Cheetham =

Archaeologist, Anthropologist & educator

David Cheetham is a Canadian archaeologist. He works primarily in Central America and specializes in the identification of Preclassic/Formative era (1800 BC-250 AD) structures and pottery.

== Career ==
Cheetham is a member of the New World Archaeological Foundation, Department of Anthropology at Brigham Young University. He has taught Anthropology courses at California State Polytechnic University Pomona , California State University, Long Beach (2007-2010) and is currently teaching at University of California, Los Angeles (2012-2013).

He has worked extensively in Belize, Guatemala and Chiapas, Mexico performing archaeological field work and pottery analysis on his own projects as well as consulting for other archaeologists, including extensive work for Jaime Awe at the BVAR.

His major digs include the excavation of the Zopilote, a Maya burial at Cahal Pech, Belize in 1993, several seasons of field work at Tikal, Guatemala, and the unearthing of a juvenile sacrificial victim in Canton Corralito/Paso de la Amada, Chiapas Mexico in 2004. He spent six months assisting Zahi Hawass during the filming of the History Channel show Chasing Mummies during which he performed underwater archaeology and helped to raise a pylon from the temple of Cleopatra VII out of the harbor at Alexandria, Egypt in 2010.

He has also appeared as an Anthropology consultant on several episodes of the History Channel's Ancient Aliens television series.

Working actively in the field of Mesoamerican Archaeology since the late 1980's, Cheetham has become an authority on the pottery and stratification based on ceramic analysis in the region of the Isthmus of Tehuantepec and the Yucatan Peninsula. His work has helped to link the Olmec site of San Lorenzo with a potential Olmec outpost in the Soconousco through exhaustive comparative analysis of the style, dating and chemical analysis of the composite materials of pottery and figurines from both the San Lorenzo Tenochtitlán and Canton Corralito sites. Additional analysis of the bones of individuals recovered from a burial at the site has reinforced these findings.

Other work by Cheetham includes the study of Cacao use in early Mesoamerican cultures through the chemical residue left in specialized pottery vessels. He has also completed several analysis' of social structures in the region through pottery style from artifacts recovered during numerous excavations of midden, structure, and elite burial contexts. He has written on the use of ceramic forms and manufacture by the Olmec, the Maya and other prehistoric cultures of Central America.
