= Diambi Kabatusuila =

Queen of Bakwa Luntu tribe

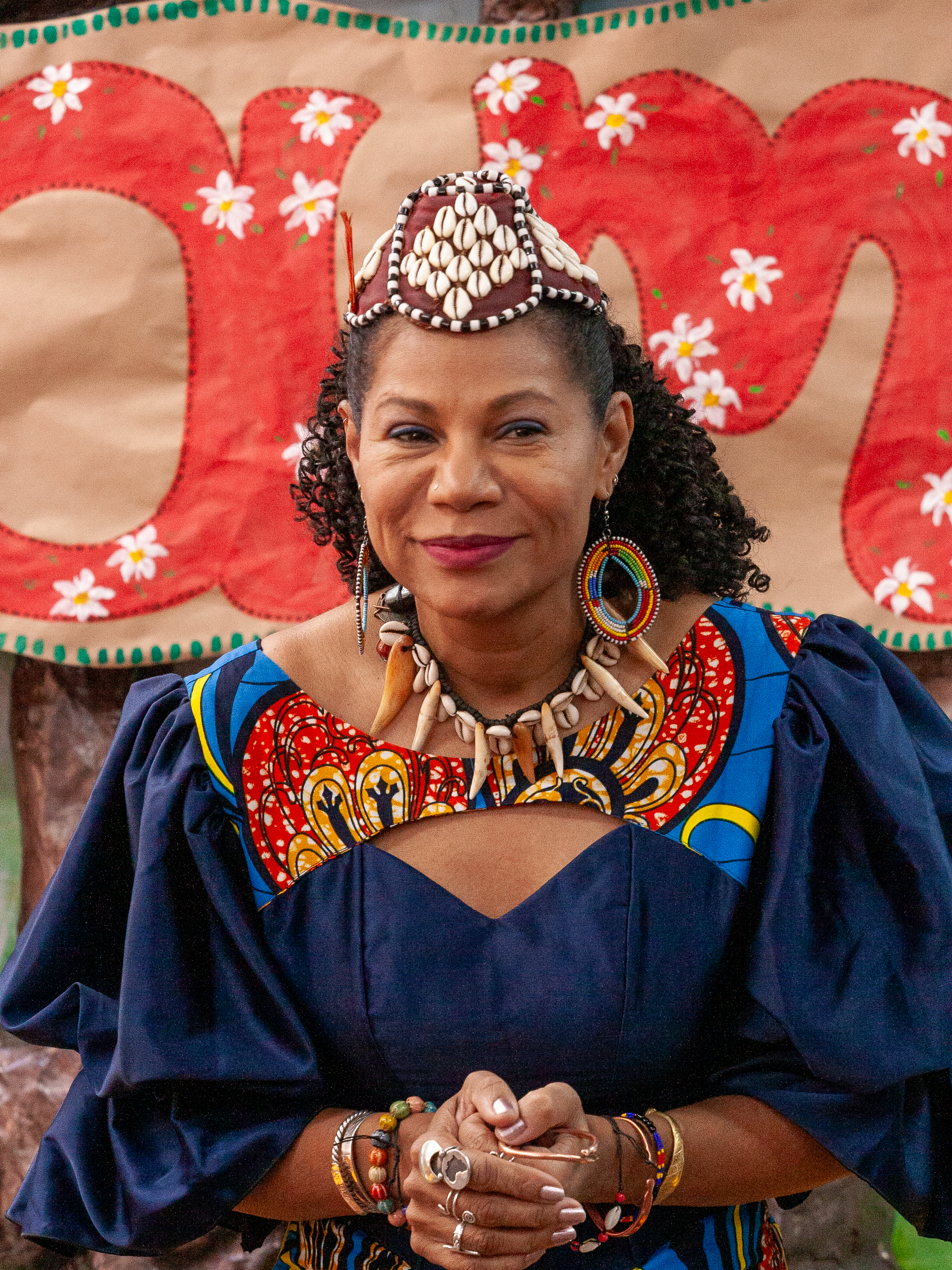
- Kabatusuila visiting the Heitor Villa-Lobos Municipal School in Porto Alegre, Brazil
- Born: Belgium
- Education: College of Staten Island
- Occupation: Queen of the Bakwa Luntu tribe from Kasaï Central
- Website: https://www.queendiambi.com/

Queen Diambi Kabatusuila Tshiyoyo Muata is the traditional queen of the Bakwa Luntu tribe of Central Kasaï in the historic Kingdom of Luba. Her name means "the bearer of good news".

== Early life ==
She was born in Belgium to a Belgian mother and Congolese father, who was a diplomat in Belgium at that time. She was raised in Kinshasa, capital of the Democratic Republic of the Congo.

== Activism ==
She is an environmental activist.

In 2021, she visited the University of Exeter to speak on plastic pollution and later addressed the Oxford Union.

== Filmography ==
- African Queens (2023)

== See also ==
- List of female monarchs
