= Heritage Key =

Heritage Key was a content-oriented online community aimed at those with an interest in history and culture. It featured both media resources and an interactive experience.

Available content included podcasts, streaming videos, news articles, interviews, discussion groups and blogs. The content was often created in conjunction with archaeologists and historians, such as the Egyptologist Dr Zahi Hawass and John Julius Norwich. Heritage Key combined this content with an online 3D virtual experience, or virtual world, that recreated artifacts and archaeological sites.

== The Virtual Experience ==
The Heritage Key Virtual Experience (VX) allowed users to explore virtual reconstructions of historical sites from around the world. Users navigated through these virtual worlds by creating avatars, enabling them to interact with each other and to explore in groups.

All artefacts and historical sites were reproduced in 3D modelling applications using measurements and photographs of the actual sites and artefacts.

Digital content creation was handled by Rezzable, a London-based team of digital artists.

== Open source approach ==
Heritage Key used a range of open source software, including content management system, Drupal, and online 3D simulation software, OpenSimulator.

== Content delivery ==
Heritage Key used a variety of existing social media platforms for sharing and viewing content, including Twitter, Flickr, Facebook, instant messaging and RSS feeds.

User-generated content was also accepted through the sharing of photos via Flickr, posting blog entries or helping to create some of the digital items in the VX.

== Potential in education ==
Heritage Key also acted as a Virtual Learning Environment. Educational institutions could use Heritage Key to develop experiences for their students inside the virtual world. Teachers could select content and choose how to deliver it in the most appropriate way. The Heritage Key VX supported real-time communication through messaging and live conversations via Skype.

== Virtual tourism ==
Three-dimensional virtual tourism allows travellers to see and explore virtual reality environments for the purpose of experiencing physical places in space and time without physically traveling there.

Heritage Key’s VX provided an environment where travelers could explore historic sites, meet and interact online and share advice or recommendations for potential destinations.
