= I Am Nasrine =

- Directed by: Tina Gharavi
- Screenplay by: Tina Gharavi
- Produced by: James Richard Baillie; Tina Gharavi
- Starring: Micsha Sadeghi; Shiraz Haq; Christian Coulson
- Cinematography: David Raedeker
- Edited by: Lesley Walker; Lucia Zucchetti
- Music by: Kamal Kamruddin; Benjamin McAvoy
- Production company: Bridge and Tunnel Productions
- Distributed by: Independent
- Release dates: 27 February 2012 (UK); 1 June 2012 (Brooklyn Film Festival)
- Running time: 93 minutes
- Country: United Kingdom
- Languages: Persian; English
- Budget: approximately £250,000

I Am Nasrine (Persian: من نسرین هستم) is a 2012 British-Iranian drama film written and directed by Tina Gharavi. The film was nominated at the 66th British Academy Film Awards for Outstanding Debut by a British Writer, Director or Producer.

== Plot ==
A middle class Iranian woman, 16-year-old Nasrine, is arrested by the Iranian police, for riding on the back of a boy's motorcycle. She is sexually assaulted in prison. She flees to the UK with her older brother Ali, and moves into a Newcastle council estate. The film touches on aspects of racism and treatment of refugees in the UK.
