= Chasing Mummies =

- Title screen
- Genre: Reality television
- Directed by: Jonathan Wyche
- Starring: Zahi Hawass
- Country of origin: United States
- Original language: English
- No. of seasons: 1
- No. of episodes: 10

Production
- Executive producers: Adam Reed; Jason Sklaver; Mohamed Gohar; Leslie Greif
- Producer: Zahi Hawass
- Production location: Egypt
- Running time: 44 minutes
- Production company: Boutique TV

Original release
- Network: History Channel
- Release: 14 July – 15 September 2010

Chasing Mummies: The Amazing Adventures of Zahi Hawass is a reality television series that aired on The History Channel in the United States. Produced by Boutique TV, the series depicted the adventures of archaeologist and Egyptologist Dr. Zahi Hawass and his discoveries in Egypt as he is followed by young archeological fellows and a camera crew. The series ran Wednesdays on the History Channel from July 14, 2010, until its end on September 15, 2010. The shows illustrates the complexities in the almost never-ending quest to preserve and discover artifacts from ancient Egypt.

== Cast ==
- Dr. Zahi Hawass is an eminent archaeologist who was Egypt's Vice Minister of Culture. In 1987, he received his Doctoral Degree (Ph.D.) from the University of Pennsylvania, where he studied as a Fulbright Fellow. He has served as Chief Inspector of the Giza Pyramid Plateau. In 1998, he was appointed as director of the Giza Plateau. In 2002 he was appointed Secretary General of the Egyptian Supreme Council of Antiquities. Hawass has been accused of self-promotion, and has made controversial statements about Jews and what he has described as Jewish "control" of the world.
- Leslie Greif is an executive producer of the show and frequently appears on camera. He has worked in various movie and television projects for the past 25 years. He produced and co-created Walker, Texas Ranger, starring Chuck Norris, and directed documentaries on Steve McQueen and Marlon Brando. His feature film credits include Funny Money, starring Chevy Chase, and Keys to Tulsa.
- Dr. Allan Morton is fellowship coordinator. He has been an archaeologist for twenty years, and holds a Ph.D. from Cambridge University.
- David Cheetham is a consulting archaeologist. He has been an archaeologist for two decades, and has conducted research in the countries of Guatemala, Belize, and Mexico.

=== Archaeological fellows ===
- Zoë D'Amato is an actress who has studied anthropology and art history at McGill University. She has worked as a librarian, an English teacher, bartender, and fundraiser for Greenpeace.
- Alice Robinson is a curator at the British Museum and archaeological researcher. She holds a master's degree in archaeology and anthropology from Oxford University.
- Derek Lincoln has an undergraduate degree in history and anthropology from the University of South Florida and a master's degree in Mediterranean archaeology from Bristol University.
- Lindsay Tanner has a degree in acting and anthropology from New York University.

== Reception ==
Chasing Mummies has been largely panned by critics, who write that Hawass is unlikeable and that the show is not an authentic documentary series. Summarizing the show, New York Times columnist Neil Genzlinger writes, "[O]ne hopes that this show will, like some of those ancient pharaohs, die young, or that Dr. Hawass will unearth some ancient Egyptian chill pills and swallow a generous helping." He said that a segment showing an intern locked in a pyramid did not seem genuine, and that the show is "intent on forcing drama into the proceedings in a way that seems artificial." According to Genzlinger, due to the comedic nature of many of the interactions depicted, it is not hard to speculate that Dr. Hawass, the producer, and cast are filming what turns out to be a running inside joke between themselves.

TVGA describes the show as "a reality series in the tradition of Bravo's Flipping Out. Like egomaniacal but essentially harmless blowhard Jeff Lewis, Zahi Hawass...is set up to be the comically abusive centerpiece of the show." Referring to an "intern" on the show, TVGA said, "If Zoe's not an actress and this show [is] not severely engineered / scripted, I'd both be surprised and deeply curious about how the hell Chasing Mummies could look this level of manipulated and artificial." The Egyptian daily Almasry Alyoum called that incident a "rather obvious bit of staged drama," and said that Hawass "is shown berating underlings in both English and Arabic, talking about himself in the third person and generally acting like a bit of a cartoon." The newspaper said Chasing Mummies "often verges on self-parody."

== Episodes ==
No.	Title	Original release date
1	"Stuck"	14 July 2010
The series introduces Zahi Hawass as he is supervising the restoration of Egypt's oldest pyramid, the Step Pyramid. During this time, the audience is also introduced to his three young archeological fellows, Lindsay, Derek, and Zoe. During his book signing later in the evening, Hawass receives a phone call from Leslie, the show's producer, stating that Zoe and one of the camera men had been accidentally locked inside the Step Pyramid. Hawass and the rest of the crew race back to the Step Pyramid to save them from potential death. Later, Hawass's workers discover a series of burial tombs underneath a city slum, and make a rare discovery, a sarcophagus and tomb that has never been robbed. Hawass quickly seizes control of the excavation, fearful of the tomb robbers that still exist in Egypt today.
2	"Trapped"	21 July 2010
Hawass leads three fellows to the Five Chambers above the Grand Gallery of the Great Pyramid. The purpose is to examine ancient graffiti on the walls of the Chambers, and explore Hawass' theory that slaves did not build the Pyramids at Giza. During their ascent into the Five Chambers, Hawass closely monitors the humidity inside the Great Pyramid, stating that anything over 80% puts the pyramid and anyone inside in great danger. Meanwhile, Zoe has no choice but to wet herself inside the Fourth Chamber, causing her to be at the opposing end of Hawass's wrath. Later, Hawass reveals his findings in an exclusive television interview, and claims that the great Pyramid would be closed indefinitely in order to protect it from the humidity caused by human activity.
3	"Lost"	28 July 2010
The time has come for Hawass's review of the fellows, and Zoe's fellowship with Hawass is already on the rocks. After being convinced to give her a last chance, Hawass takes her and Leslie along to one of his excavations of an unfinished tomb, leaving Lindsay and Derek to remain in Saqqara to observe the excavation of the tomb in that location. During the trip to the unfinished tomb, Hawass's vehicle breaks down eight miles from the site, and he convinces everyone that they must walk through the desert to get to the site. During this time, Hawass and Zoe reconnect as they find a tribe willing to lend them horses and camels. They arrive at the site four hours late, and Leslie blames Hawass for the "near death" experience of walking through the desert. After they arrive at the site, Hawass's workers discover a rare and important piece of Egyptian history...a beautiful anthropoid sarcophagus from the 26th Dynasty. After a long day, Hawass still is slated to open Cairo's newest night club.
4	"Discovered"	4 August 2010
Army maneuvers have shut down their journey to restore an ancient minaret at Dakhla, so Hawass leads them on a daytime hike through the White Desert to camp overnight in a deserted oasis. The fellows had not prepared for such a trip. Their food is 115-degree temperatures, but local Bedouins provide food. Hawass then flies out to Dallas to speak about his recent discovery of Queen Sesheshet's Pyramid.
5	"Sunken"	11 August 2010
This episode focuses on an effort to find Cleopatra's tomb. The archaeologists travel to Alexandria, where she lived with Julius Caesar and Mark Anthony. Hawass allows archaeologists from the Hellenic Institute to dive into the Mediterranean Sea and bring up a nine-ton pylon that is a confirmed part of her historic shrine. But the archaeologists have persistent problems obtaining permits from authorities and adequate equipment in order to bring up the stone. With a storm fast approaching, and the Minister of Culture and the worldwide international press is waiting on the shoreline, time is limited to get the job done and show the pylon to the world.
6	"Robbed"	18 August 2010
Hawass and the group head to Sheikh Sobey and discovers a mummy inside a buried sarcophagus. The archaeologists also bring a missing piece of an offering table that is being returned to Karnak Temple in Luxor from New York's Metropolitan Museum of Art, which purchased it from a dealer for the purpose of returning it to Egypt. Archaeological fellow Lindsay leaves the program, upset that she is not given enough time with Hawass.
7	"Meltdown"	25 August 2010
In Saqqara, Hawass opens two sealed tombs, but Zoe is late and Hawass is impatient. Other archaeologists attend the Festival of the Sacrifice, and learn about Egyptian customs. Hawass meets the press and discusses an archaeological expedition at a monastery. Zoe quits the fellowship program after a dispute with her husband and returns home, leaving Derek as the only fellow left.
8	"Bats"	1 September 2010
Zahi is determined to debunk the theories of "pyrimidiots" who claim that there are hidden chambers underneath the sphinx that contain records of Atlantis and extraterrestrials. Along with his pending retirement, and following a discovery of a father/son tomb, Zahi ventures into a cave system with Derek, David, and Alan to try to debunk these conspiracy theories made popular by psychics claiming that these caves lead to a hidden shaft system underneath the sphinx. Little did Zahi and the crew realize that this cave system was a dead-end, and home to thousands of bats, one of the two animals that Zahi hates.
9	"Cursed"	8 September 2010
Zahi gains a new fellow named Alice, and takes the crew on a trip through the Valley of the Kings. Due to the loose rocks and rough terrain, Zahi hurts himself when Alan slides into him while walking. Meanwhile, Derek and Gohar travel to another tomb to investigate ancient graffiti. During the trip in the Valley of the Kings, Zahi receives a phone call about a new discovery that is associated with Cleopatra in the Hall of Sphinxes.
10	"Buried"	15 September 2010
In the season finale, Zahi's team names a tomb complex after him; and they discover five burial remains, including the mummified body of a murder victim.
