= Zahi Hawass =

Egyptian Egyptologist (born 1947)

Zahi Hawass ORE
- زاهي حواس
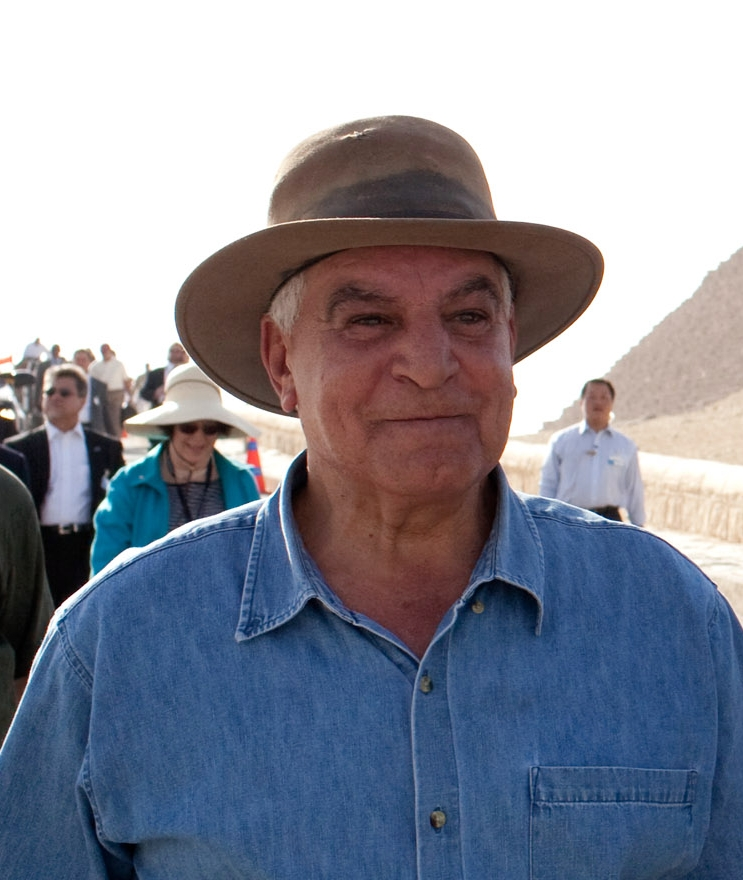
- Hawass in 2009

1st Minister of Antiquities
- In office January 31, 2011 – March 3, 2011
- President: Hosni Mubarak
- Prime Minister: Ahmed Shafik
- Preceded by: Office created
- Succeeded by: Mohamed Ibrahim Ali
- In office April 5, 2011 – July 17, 2011
- Prime Minister: Essam Sharaf
- Succeeded by: Mohamed Said

Personal details
- Profession: Egyptologist
- Born: May 28, 1947 (age 79); Damietta, Egypt
- Spouse: Fekrya Hawass
- Children: 2

Academic background
- Education: University of Pennsylvania (MA, PhD); Cairo University; Alexandria University (BA)
- Thesis: The Funerary Establishments of Khufu, Khafra and Menkaura During the Old Kingdom (1987)
- Doctoral advisor: David O'Connor; David P. Silverman
- Website: hawasszahi.com

Zahi Abass Hawass (Arabic: زاهي عباس حواس; born May 28, 1947) is an Egyptian archaeologist, Egyptologist, and former Minister of Tourism and Antiquities, a position he held twice. He has worked at archaeological sites in the Nile Delta, the Western Desert and the Upper Nile Valley.

== Early life ==
Hawass was born in a small village near Damietta, Egypt. Although he once dreamed of becoming an attorney, he ended up becoming an Egyptologist. Hawass was involved in excavations early on. He recalled that in 1960, he was part of a group working with Sheikh Ali Abdel-Rasoul in the Tomb of Seti I in the Valley of the Kings, when they found a tunnel in the tomb. Hawass also recalled that, as a young archaeologist excavating at Kom Abu Billo, he had to help transport several artifacts from the Greco-Roman site.

He obtained a Bachelor of Arts degree in Greek and Roman archaeology from Alexandria University in 1967. In 1979, Hawass earned a diploma in Egyptology from Cairo University. He then worked at the Great Pyramids as an inspector—a combination of administrator and archaeologist.

When he was 33 years old, Hawass was awarded a Fulbright Fellowship to attend the University of Pennsylvania in Philadelphia to study Egyptology, earning a Master of Arts degree in the subject and also one in Syro-Palestinian archaeology in 1983, and his PhD in Egyptology in 1987 from the University of Pennsylvania's Graduate Group in the Art and Archaeology of the Mediterranean World (AAMW), concentrating on "The Funerary Establishments of Khufu, Khafra and Menkaura During the Old Kingdom."

== Career ==
=== Archaeology and early government career ===
Hawass was Associate Director of Excavation at Hermopolis in 1968 and Tarrana 1970–74. Since 1975, he has been Excavation Director and Restoration Director at various sites throughout Egypt, predominantly Giza.

From 1969 to 1975, Hawass was Inspector of Antiquities for a multitude of archaeological expeditions, for instance the Yale Expedition at Abydos, Egypt in 1969, and Abu Simbel between 1972 and 1974.

He sporadically taught Egyptian archaeology and history and culture at universities in Egypt and the US between 1988 and 2001, most notably at the American University in Cairo, the University of California, Los Angeles and Alexandria University. Hawass has described his efforts as trying to help institute a systematic program for the preservation and restoration of historical monuments, while training Egyptians to improve their expertise on methods of excavation, retrieval and preservation.

==== Giza ====
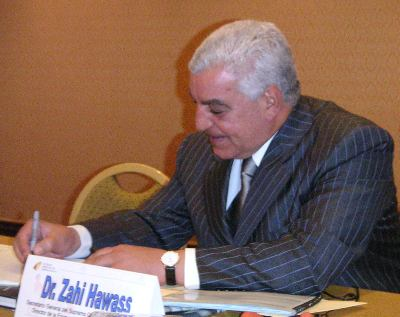
Hawass at a book signing in Mexico City, August 2003.

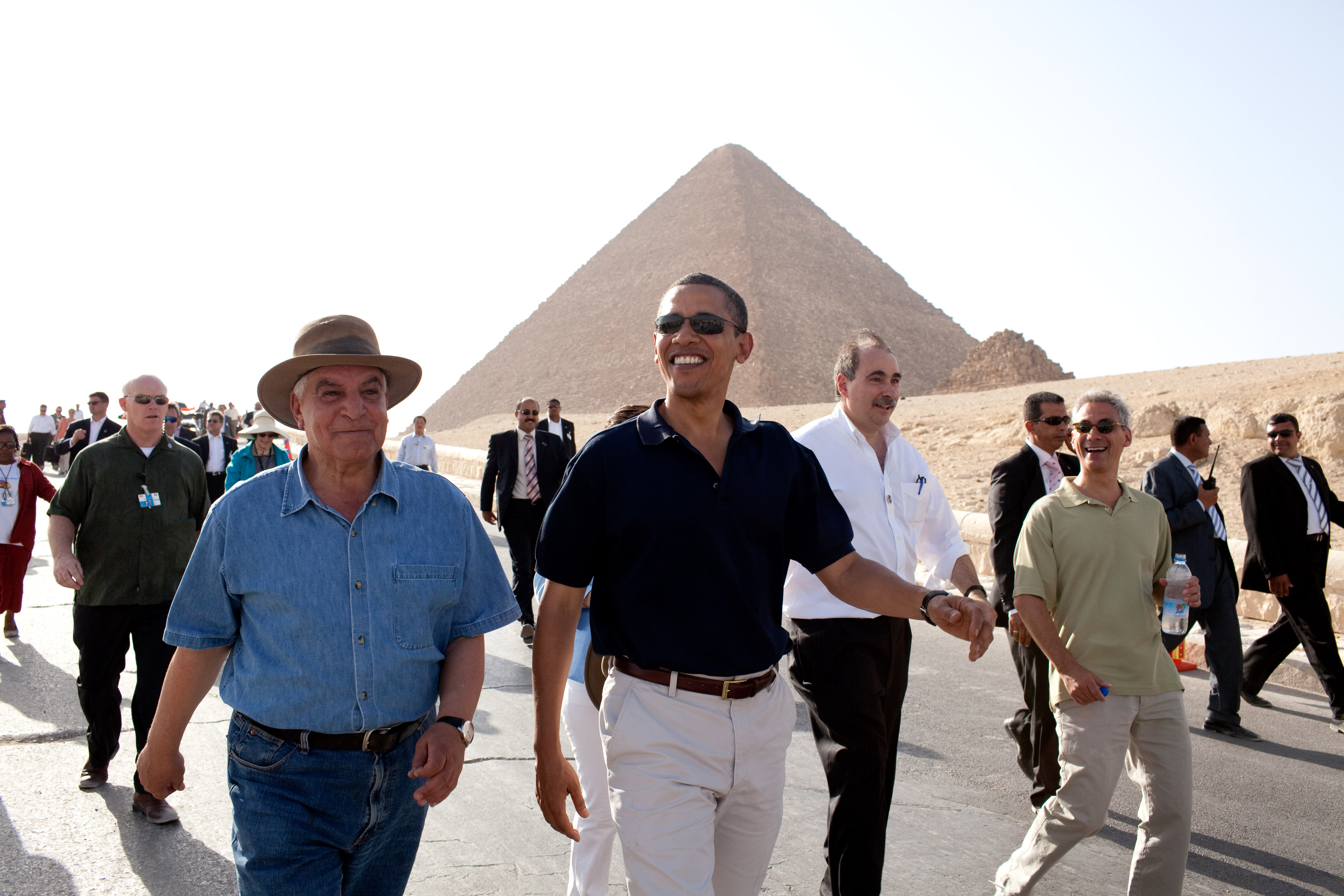
Zahi Hawass and Barack Obama, June 2009

Hawass was Inspector of Antiquities for Giza 1972–74, First Inspector until 1979 and Chief Inspector in 1980. Starting in 1987, he held the position of Director General of the Giza monuments, which included the sites of Giza, Saqqara, Memphis, Dahshur, Abusir and Bahariya Oasis.

After the discovery of Gantenbrink's Door in 1993, he left the position – according to Hawass, a resignation – but was reinstated several months later, following a change in leadership and the transformation of the Egyptian Antiquities Organization into the Supreme Council of Antiquities.

He was promoted to Undersecretary of the State for the Giza Monuments in 1998.

Hawass continues to be involved in archaeological projects at Giza and other sites in Egypt. As of 2017, he headed the science committee overseeing the ScanPyramids project.

=== Politics ===
In 2002, Hawass was appointed as the Secretary General of the Supreme Council of Antiquities. When US President Barack Obama visited Cairo in June 2009, Hawass gave him personal tours of ancient Egyptian archaeological sites. Facing mandatory retirement, he was promoted by President Hosni Mubarak to the post of Vice Minister of Culture at the end of 2009.

==== 2011 protest vandalism ====
On January 29, 2011, in the midst of the Egyptian protests of that year, Hawass arrived at the Egyptian Museum in Cairo to find that a number of cases had been broken into and a number of antiquities damaged, so police were brought in to secure the museum. According to Andrew Lawler, reporting for Science, Hawass said that he "faxed a colleague in Italy that 13 cases were destroyed. My heart is broken and my blood is boiling".

Hawass later told The New York Times that thieves looking for gold broke 70 objects, including two sculptures of the pharaoh Tutankhamun, and took two skulls from a research lab, before being stopped as they left the museum.

==== Minister of Antiquities ====
Hawass was appointed to the position of Minister of State for Antiquities Affairs, a newly created cabinet post, by Mubarak on January 31, 2011, as part of a cabinet shake-up during the 2011 protests. A press release including a statement from Hawass stated that he "will continue excavating, writing books, and representing his country," ensuring that archaeological sites in Egypt were being safeguarded and looted objects returned. Regarding the Egyptian Museum looting, he said: "The museum was dark and the nine robbers did not recognise the value of what was in the vitrines. They opened thirteen cases, threw the seventy objects on the ground and broke them, including one Tutankhamun case, from which they broke the statue of the king on a panther. However, the broken objects can all be restored, and we will begin the restoration process this week." Hawass rejected comparisons with the looting of antiquities in Iraq and Afghanistan.

On February 13, Mahmoud Kassem of Bloomberg reported Hawass as saying that "18 artifacts, including statues of King Tutankhamun", were stolen from the Egyptian Museum in January; Kassem, paraphrasing Hawass, continues: "The missing objects include 11 wooden shabti statuettes from Yuya, a gilded wooden statue of Tutankhamun carried by a goddess and a statue of Nefertiti making offerings".

Egyptian state television reported that Hawass called upon Egyptians not to believe the "lies and fabrications" of the Al Jazeera and Al Arabiya satellite television channels. Hawass later said: "They should give us the opportunity to change things, and if nothing happens they can march again. But you can't bring in a new president now, in this time. We need Mubarak to stay and make the transition". On March 3, 2011, he resigned after a list was posted on his personal website of dozens of sites across Egypt that were looted during the 2011 protests.

Hawass was reappointed Minister of Antiquities by then-Prime Minister Essam Sharaf. On March 30, 2011, a tweet was posted, stating: "I am very happy to be the Minister of Antiquities once again!" but resigned on July 17, 2011, after Sharaf informed him he would not be continuing in the position. According to opinion report from an Egyptian commentator in The Guardian, Hawass was "sacked".

=== Claimed discoveries ===
As his biography at the National Geographic Explorers webpage notes, he states that he is responsible for many recent discoveries, including the tombs of the pyramid builders at Giza and the Valley of the Golden Mummies at Bahariya. At Giza, he also uncovered the satellite pyramid of Khufu. In 2005, as part of the National Geographic Society-sponsored Egyptian Mummy Project to learn more about patterns of disease, health, and mortality in ancient Egypt, he led a team that CT scanned the mummy of King Tutankhamun. His team is continuing to CT scan mummies, both royal and private, and hopes to solve some of the mysteries surrounding the lives and deaths of such important figures as Hatshepsut and Nefertiti.

== Appearances ==
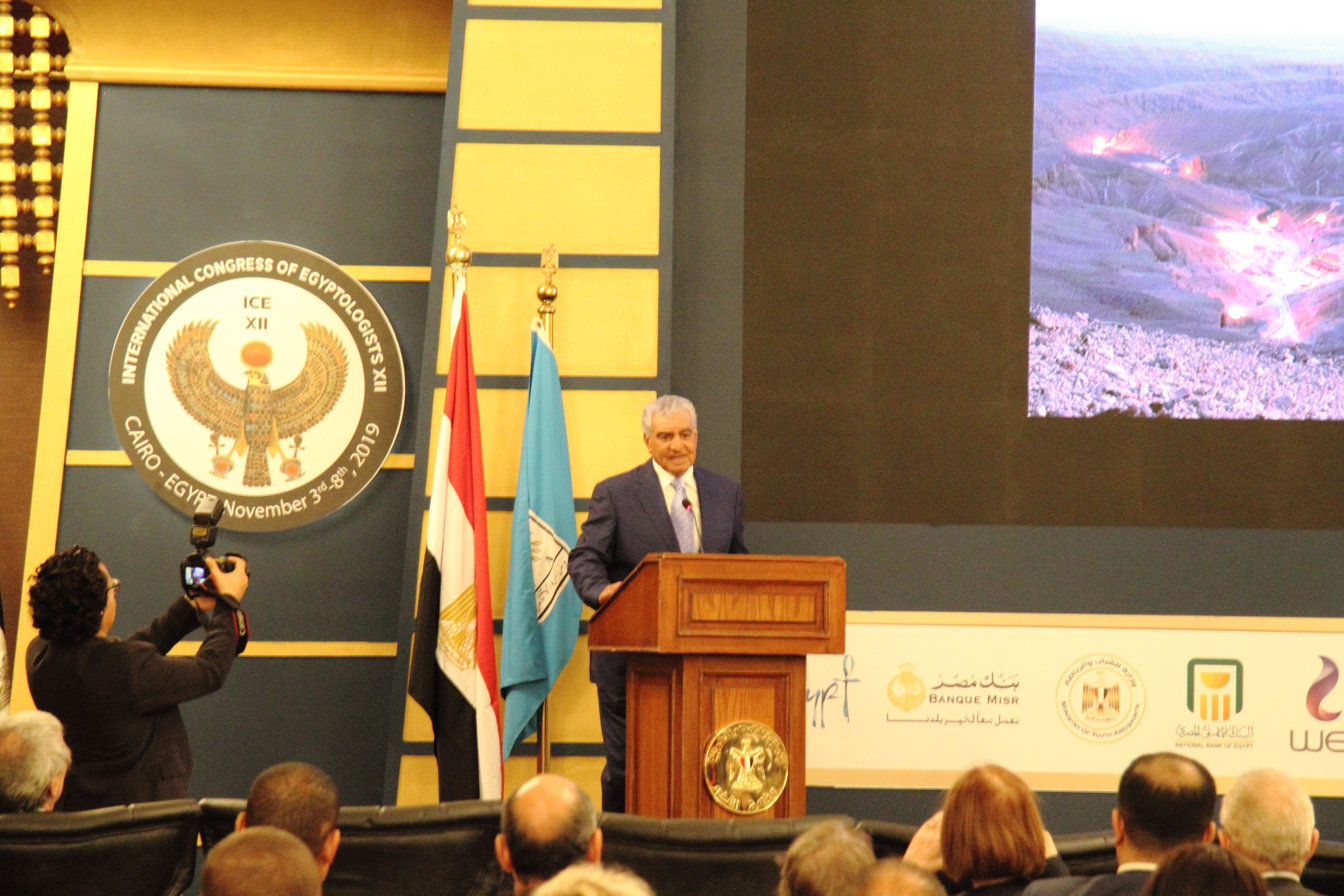
Speaking at the International Congress of Egyptologists in Cairo, November 2019

Hawass has appeared on television specials on channels such as the National Geographic Channel, the History Channel and the Discovery Channel. Hawass has also appeared in several episodes of the U.S. television show Digging for the Truth, discussing mummies, the pyramids, Tutankhamun, Cleopatra and Ramesses II. He also appeared on Unsolved Mysteries during a segment on the curse of Tutankhamun's tomb. In 2010, Hawass appeared on a reality-based television show on The History Channel called Chasing Mummies.

Hawass also worked alongside Egyptologist Otto Schaden during the opening of Tomb KV63 in February 2006 – the first intact tomb to be found in the Valley of the Kings since 1922.

In June 2007, Hawass announced that he and a team of experts may have identified the mummy of Hatshepsut, in KV60, a small tomb in the Valley of the Kings. The opening of the sealed tomb was described in 2006 as "one of the most important events in the Valley of the Kings for almost a hundred years."

Hawass was interviewed about his work by Keith Floyd as part of his television series Floyd around the Med in the episode "Cairo, Egypt and Aswan to Luxor" (2000).

Hawass was the host of the documentary Egypt's Ten Greatest Discoveries.

In May 2025, Hawass appeared as a guest on episode #2321 of The Joe Rogan Experience podcast.

== Views ==
=== Return of artifacts to Egypt ===
Since the 2000s, Hawass has repeatedly spearheaded movements to return many prominent and irregularly taken Ancient Egyptian artifacts back to Egypt from collections in various other countries. Examples of these artifacts include: the Rosetta Stone, the bust of Nefertiti, the Dendera zodiac ceiling painting from the Dendera Temple, the bust of Ankhhaf (the architect of the Khafre Pyramid), the faces of Amenhotep III's tomb at the Louvre Museum, the Luxor Temple's obelisk at the Place de la Concorde and the statue of Hemiunu.

In July 2003, the Egyptians requested the return of the Rosetta Stone from the British Museum. Hawass, then serving as Secretary General of the Supreme Council of Antiquities in Cairo, spoke at a press conference saying: "If the British want to be remembered, if they want to restore their reputation, they should volunteer to return the Rosetta Stone because it is the icon of our Egyptian identity". Referring to Egyptian antiquities at the British Museum, Hawass said: "These are Egyptian monuments. I will make life miserable for anyone who keeps them".

In 2019, Hawass relaunched his restitution campaign, asking the Berlin State Museums, the British Museum and the Musée du Louvre: "How can you refuse to lend to the new Grand Egyptian Museum when you have taken so many antiquities from Egypt?" All three museums refused his loan requests.

In 2022, Hawass launched another petition, calling once again for the return of the Rosetta Stone, the bust of Nefertiti and the Dendera Zodiac ceiling to Egypt.

=== DNA testing of Egyptian mummies ===
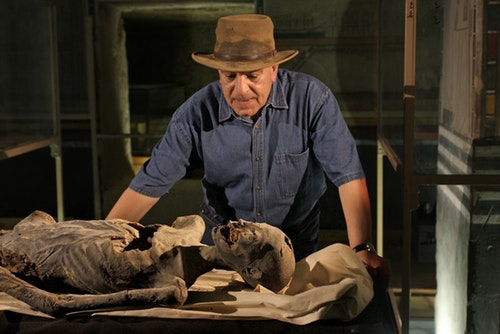
Hawass examining a mummy (2018).

Hawass has been skeptical of the DNA testing of Egyptian mummies: "From what I understand," he has said, "it is not always accurate and it cannot always be done with complete success when dealing with mummies. Until we know for sure that it is accurate, we will not use it in our research."

In December 2000, a joint team from Waseda University in Japan and Cairo's Ain Shams University tried to get permission for DNA testing of Egyptian mummies, but was denied by the Egyptian Government. Hawass stated at the time that DNA analysis was out of the question because it would not lead to anything.

In February 2010, Hawass and his team announced that they had analyzed the mummies of Tutankhamun and ten other mummies and said that the king could have died from a malaria infection that followed a leg fracture. German researchers Christian Timmann and Christian Meyer have cast doubt on this theory, suggesting other possible alternatives for Tutankhamun's cause of death.

In 2012, a study signed by Hawass disclosed that Ramses III may have had a haplogroup E1b1a that most dominant in Sub-Saharan Africa, and it also occurs at moderate frequencies in North Africa, West Asia, and Southern Europe.

A 2020 study by Gad, Hawass, et al. analysed mitochondrial and Y-chromosomal haplogroups from Tutankhamun's family members of the 18th Dynasty, using comprehensive control procedures to ensure quality results. The study found that the Y-chromosome haplogroup of the family was R1b. Haplogroup R1b is carried by modern Egyptians. Modern Egypt is also the only African country that is known to harbor all three R1 subtypes, including R1b-M269. While mitochondrial linage was found to be on K and H2b, both haplogroups did not originate in Africa yet it exists in both Ancient and Modern Egyptians.

=== On Afrocentrism ===
Hawass has refuted Afrocentrist claims of ancient Egyptian history, and explained "We are not against black people at all, but we are against this group that entered the Egyptian Museum in Tahrir to announce ideas that have no basis in truth and are fantasies", after an Afrocentric travel group was found to be falsifying history in the Egyptian Museum. He added, "There is a very important fact Afrocentrists need to know: the depictions on Egyptian temples from the Old Kingdom to the end of the Late Period show the King of Egypt and in front of him are captives from Africa, Libya, Syria, and Palestine," referring to Ramses III Prisoner tiles among other evidence that show the difference between Egyptians and their neighbors.

Following Netflix's Cleopatra controversy, Hawass appeared in a 90-minute documentary "Cleopatra", released on director Curtis Ryan Woodside's YouTube channel. In the video Hawass expounds on the Ptolemaic dynasty's last ruler. Hawass stated "Was Cleopatra black? First of all, I have nothing against black people at all, but I am stating the facts -- look at the Macedonian queens, none of them were black".

Despite his criticism of documentary, Hawassa did not support the lawsuit against Netflix over the film, stating "We can't make a case against the Netflix platform, because we will definitely lose as they have the right to broadcast as long as it is a matter of freedom of opinion, and we can make a movie that overshadows everything they did.. but our case against them will not be successful." He also pointed out, "Two years ago, Mostafa Waziri (the Supreme Council of Antiquities) and I worked with the Netflix platform on the archaeological discoveries in Saqqara, and the film has been translated into 129 languages and will be released soon. They broadcast all the work."

In 2023, after ending his lecture about ancient Egypt in Columbus, Ohio, Hawass asked the audience whether they have any questions. An African-American woman stood up and asked: "Why do you attack us?". He said "When the woman asked me this question, I replied, 'No I didn't attack you, but let's discuss the evidence that refutes the claim of ancient Egypt's black African origins'." He went on to explain and provide evidence that Ancient Egyptian civilization is Egyptian-made not-African made, "African countries and Egypt share the same Nile. But the ancient Egyptian civilization occurred here in Egypt, not in any other African country."

=== Aliens and the Pyramids ===
Hawass criticized a tweet by US billionaire Elon Musk claiming that aliens built the pyramids. He stated in a TV interview that studying ancient Egyptian civilization provides a comprehensive understanding of its secrets. "Elon Musk's comment on the pyramids indicates his lack of knowledge about the history of Egyptian civilization," he said. He noted that there are those who spread false rumors about ancient Egyptian civilization to gain attention, stressing: "Anyone who doubts Egyptian civilization, I will confront them. I am holding a stick for anyone who spreads these false rumors." Hawass often refers to the Merer Papyrus and Tombs of pyramid builders as the biggest evidence on the fact that the pyramids were built by Egyptian workers.

=== Biblical and Quranic stories ===
Hawass said that the archeology and antiquities do not contain proof that Moses or Joseph lived in Egypt or the exodus of the Israelites from it. He said, "I am a Muslim who believes that our Master Moses lived in Egypt and that the exodus occurred from Egypt, but on the other hand, is there evidence in the antiquities that prove this? The answer is no". Hawass also asserted that there is no archeological evidence confirming the identity of the pharaoh who ruled during the arrival of the Prophets Moses and Joseph to Egypt, adding that information currently available on the issue is limited to guesses and speculation.

== Controversies ==
=== Relationships with other archaeologists ===
Hawass has been accused of domineering behavior, forbidding archaeologists to announce their own findings and courting the media for his own gain after they were denied access to archaeological sites because, according to Hawass, they were too amateurish. A few, however, have said in interviews that some of what Hawass has done for the field was long overdue. Hawass has typically ignored or dismissed his critics and, when asked about it, he indicated that what he does is for the sake of Egypt and the preservation of its antiquities.

=== Views on Israel and Jews ===
Hawass has been a long-standing opponent of normalized relations between Israel and Egypt. In an interview on Egyptian television in April 2009, Hawass stated that "although Jews are few in number, they control the entire world" and commented on the "control they have" of the American economy and the media. He later wrote that he was using rhetoric to explain political fragmentation among the Arabs, and that he does not believe in a "Jewish conspiracy to control the world".

Zahi Hawass aided the Egyptian government in renovating the Maimonides Synagogue in what was once a Jewish neighborhood in Old Cairo, stating: "If you don't restore the Jewish synagogues, you lose part of your history." The official inauguration ceremony was later canceled due to media reports of Jews "dancing and drinking alcohol in the synagogue" during an earlier private dedication, which Hawass described as a "provocation to the feelings of hundreds of millions of Muslims in Egypt and around the world". Hawass later added that the decision to scrap the ceremony was made at "a time when Muslim holy sites in occupied Palestine face assaults from Israeli occupation forces and settlers". Later still, he characterized the cancellation of the ceremony as a "strong slap in the face" to "the Zionist enemy." He also refused requests to build an Egyptian Jewish museum, citing the Israeli-Palestinian conflict.

=== Aftermath of 2011 protests ===
Criticism of Hawass, in Egypt and more broadly, increased following the protests in Egypt in 2011. On July 12, 2011, The New York Times reported that Hawass receives an honorarium each year "of as much as $200,000 from National Geographic to be an explorer-in-residence even as he controls access to the ancient sites it often features in its reports." The Times also reported that he has relationships with two American companies that do business in Egypt.

On April 17, 2011, Hawass was sentenced to jail for one year for refusing to obey a court ruling relating to a contract for the gift shop at the Egyptian Museum to a company with links to Hawass. The ruling was appealed and this specific sentence was suspended pending appeal. The following day, the National Council of Egypt's Administrative Court issued a decree to overturn the court's original ruling, specifying that he would serve no jail time, and would instead remain in his position as Minister of Antiquities. The jail sentence was lifted after a new contract was solicited for the running of the gift shop.

=== Association with Mubarak ===
As Minister of Antiquities, Hawass was closely associated with the government of former President Hosni Mubarak. His resignation as minister on March 3, 2011, and his re-appointment to the Ministry on March 30, 2011, have been seen as part of the overall events surrounding Mubarak's resignation. It was reported that his re-appointment angered numerous factions, who opposed the appointment of any of the old guard under Mubarak to new positions in the government. The 2011 Egyptian protests resulted in increased criticism of Hawass. Demonstrators called for his resignation, and the upheaval increased attention on his relationship with the Mubarak family and the way in which he has increased his public profile in recent years.

=== Commercial endeavors ===
Hawass has lent his name to a line of men's apparel, described by The New York Times as "a line of rugged khakis, denim shirts and carefully worn leather jackets that are meant, according to the catalog copy, to hark "back to Egypt's golden age of discovery in the early 20th century"; the clothing was first sold at Harrods department store in London, in April 2011. Critics say the Hawass clothing commercializes Egyptian history, and objected to their understanding that "models had sat on or scuffed priceless ancient artifacts during the photo shoot", an accusation that was denied by Hawass and the clothing manufacturers. Hawass already sells a line of Stetson hats reproducing the ones he wears, which "very much resemble" the ones worn by Harrison Ford in the Indiana Jones movies.

== Personal life ==
Hawass is married to Fekrya Hawass, a gynecologist whom he met in 1967. They have two sons, one a physician, the other a restaurateur, both living in Cairo.

He was a close friend of actor Omar Sharif and accompanied him during his final days in 2015. In 2020, Hawass posted on Instagram remembering his friend: "Yesterday I remembered my dear friend Omar El-Sherif who was born on April 10th. We used to celebrate together and I would sing for him the song by Marilyn Monroe celebrating the birthday of President JF Kennedy and he would sing the same song to me on my birthday."

Hawass was a friend of Jehan Sadat, the former First Lady of Egypt. Hawass and Sadat organized "private tour of the country's pharaonic sites" for guests for years until her death in 2021. "Her charisma was electrifying to an extent that when she spoke the audience would be so silent you could hear a pin drop," Hawass told news outlets at the time.

Hawass is often mistaken for being a Coptic Christian because of his name, even though he is Muslim.

== Awards ==
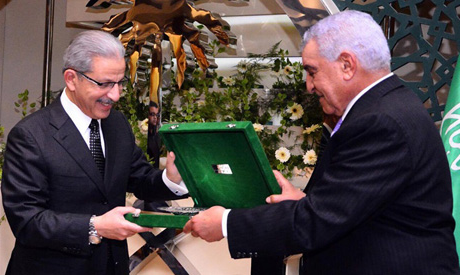
Zahi Hawass receives the Grand Prize of the Saudi Arabia Ministry of Culture (2018).

Hawass is the recipient of the Egyptian state award of the first degree for his work in the Sphinx restoration project. In 2001, he was silver medallist offered by the Russian Academy of Natural Sciences. In 2002, he was awarded the American Academy of Achievement's Golden Plate and the glass obelisk from US scholars for his efforts to the protection and preservation of Ancient Egyptian monuments. In 2003, Hawass was given international membership in the Russian Academy for Natural Sciences (RANS) and, in 2006, he was chosen as one of the world's 100 most influential people by Time. In 2015, he was awarded the Golden Memorial Medal of Charles University. In 2018, he was awarded by the Academia Brasileira de Letras for being the only archaeologist who wrote more than 30 books. In the same year, he received the Presidential Medal of the Republic of Kosovo in recognition for his entire academic output. Also in 2018, he received the grand prize of the Saudi Arabia Ministry of Culture. In 2022, he received the plaque of honour from the Faculty of Economics and Political Sciences of Cairo. In 2026, he was honoured in the US capital, Washington, D.C., with the Meridian Cultural Diplomacy Award.

Hawass has received many honorary degrees. From outside Egypt, he has received honorary doctorates from the University of Pennsylvania (2000), the University of Lisbon (2011), the Chandrakasem Rajabhat University (2011), the New Bulgarian University (2016), the Universidad Católica Santo Domingo (2016), the Universidad San Ignacio de Loyola (2017) and the Russian State University for the Humanities (2021).

== Honors ==
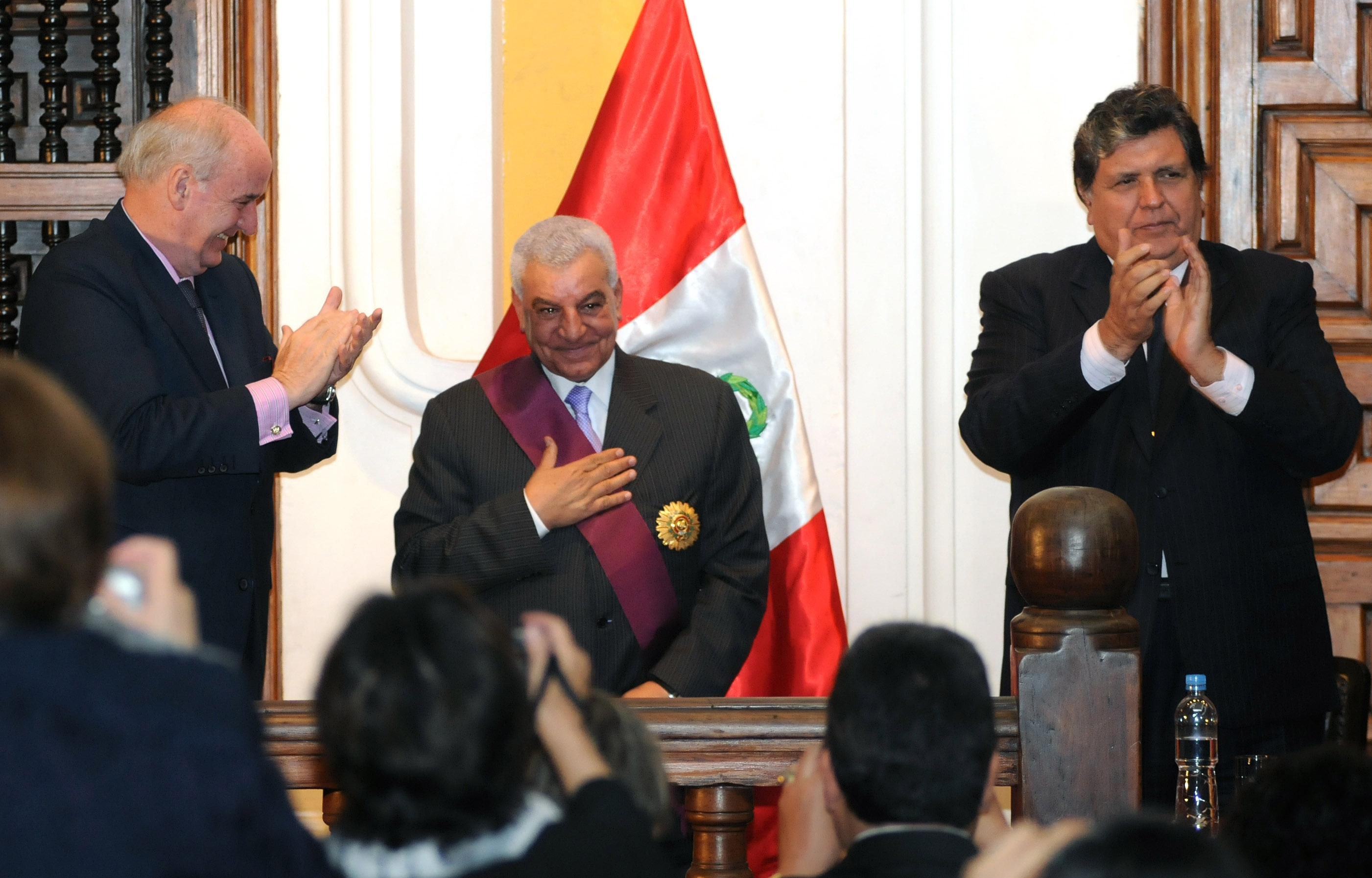
Peruvian President Alan García decorates Zahi Hawass with the insignia of Grand Cross of the Order of the Sun of Peru (Lima, July 4, 2011).

- Algeria: Knight (Achir) of the National Order of Merit (Algeria) (2007)
- Austria: Grand Decoration of Honour in Silver with Star of the Decoration of Honour for Services to the Republic of Austria (2010)
- Egypt: Grand Cordon of the Order of Merit (Egypt)
- France: Officier of the Ordre des Arts et des Lettres (2007)
- Italy: Commander of the Order of Merit of the Italian Republic (2007)
- Japan: Gold Rays with Neck Ribbon of the Order of the Rising Sun (2021)
- Peru: Grand Cross of the Order of the Sun of Peru (2011)
- Poland: Officier of the Order of Merit of the Republic of Poland (2020)
- Poland: Silver Medal of the Gloria Artis Medal for Merit to Culture (2010)
- Spain: Knight of the Order of Arts and Letters of Spain (2009)

== Works ==
Hawass has written and co-written many books relating to Egyptology, including The Curse of the Pharaohs: My Adventures with Mummies, and King Tutankhamun: The Treasures from the Tomb, the latter published to coincide with a major exhibition in the UK. He has also written on Tutankhamun for Ancient Egypt.

Hawass is a regular columnist for Egypt Today and the online historical community Heritage Key. He has narrated several videos on Egyptology, including a series on Tutankhamun.

=== Main publications ===
- The Great Book of Ancient Egypt: In the Realm of the Pharaohs. London: White Star. 2018.
- Giza and the Pyramids. London: Thames & Hudson. 2017.
- Scanning the Pharaohs: CT Imaging of the New Kingdom Royal Mummies. Cairo: American University in Cairo Press. 2016.
- Newly-Discovered Statues from Giza (1990-2009). Cairo: Ministry of Culture. 2011.
- Highlights of the Egyptian Museum. Cairo: The American University in Cairo Press. 2011.
- Inside the Egyptian Museum. Cairo: The American University in Cairo Press. 2010.
- Cleopatra: The Search for the Last Queen of Egypt. Washington, D.C.: National Geographic Society. 2010.
- Life in Paradise: The Noble Tombs of Thebes. Cairo: American University in Cairo Press. 2009.
- King Tutankhamun: The Treasures of the Tomb. Thames & Hudson. 2008.
- Old Kingdom Pottery from Giza. Cairo: Ministry of Culture. 2008.
- The Royal Tombs of Egypt: The Art of Thebes Revealed. Thames & Hudson. 2006.
- Mountains of the Pharaohs: A History of the Pyramids of Egypt. New York: Doubleday Books. 2006.
- Tutankhamun and the Golden Age of the Pharaohs: A Souvenir Book. London: National Geographic Society. 2005.
- Tutankhamun: The Mystery of the Boy King. London: National Geographic Society. 2005.
- The Island of Kalabsha. Cairo: American University in Cairo Press. 2005.
- How the Great Pyramid Was Built. Washington, D.C.: Smithsonian Books. 2004.
- Curse of the Pharaohs: My Adventures With Mummies. London: National Geographic Society. 2004.
- Hidden Treasures of Ancient Egypt: Unearthing the Masterpieces of Egyptian History. London: National Geographic Society. 2004.
- The Golden Age of Tutankhamun: Divine Might and Splendor in the New Kingdom. Cairo: American University in Cairo Press. 2004.
- Hawass, Zahi; Fromkin, David; Viorst, Milton (2004). Cradle & Crucible: History and Faith in the Middle East. London: National Geographic Society.
- Tesoros de las Piramides. Washington, D.C.: Grupo Oceano. 2004.
- The Treasures of the Pyramids. London: White Star. 2003.
- Egyptian Museum Collections Around the World: Studies for the Centennial of the Egyptian Museum. Cairo: American University in Cairo Press. 2003.
- Secrets from the Sand: My Search for Egypt's Past. New York: Harry N. Abrams. 2003.
- Bibliotheca Alexandrina: The Archaeology Museum. Cairo: American University in Cairo Press. 2003.
- Egyptology at the Dawn of the Twenty-First Century: History, Religion: Proceedings of the Eighth International. Cairo: American University in Cairo Press. 2003.
- Hidden Treasures of the Egyptian Museum: One Hundred Masterpieces Form the Centennial Exhibition. Cairo: American University in Cairo Press. 2003.
- Gates, Pamela S.; Hawass, Zahi (2003). Fantasy Literature for Children and Young Adults. Washington, D.C.: Scarecrow Press.
- The Mysteries of Abu Simbel: Ramesses II and the Temples of the Rising Sun. Cairo: American University in Cairo Press. 2001.
- Valley of the Golden Mummies: The Greatest Egyptian Discovery Since Tutankhamun. London: Virgin Books. 2000.
- The Egyptian Monuments: Problems and Solutions. Berlin: Gruyter. 1995.
- Silent Images: Women in Pharaonic Egypt. Cultural Development Fund, Ministry of Culture. 1995.
- The Program of the Royal Funerary Complexes of the Fourth Dynasty (PDF). Leiden/New York/Koln: E.J. Brill. 1995. pp. 221–262. Archived from the original (PDF) on April 1, 2016.
- The Funerary Establishments of Khufu, Khafra and Menkaura During the Old Kingdom. Pennsylvania: University of Pennsylvania. 1987.
