= Adesuwa Oni =

British actress

- Other name: Adele Oni
- Citizenship: British
- Education: Millfield
- Alma mater: University of Southampton; London School of Economics
- Occupation: Actress
- Years active: 2016–present

Adesuwa Oni is a British actress. She is known for her roles as Queen Njinga in the Netflix docudrama series African Queens: Njinga and Ngozi Okoye in the BBC medical drama series Casualty.

== Life and career ==
Oni attended Millfield in Somerset, where she studied drama for her A-levels. Oni had a passion for acting since the age of five, which she accredits to watching Singin' in the Rain as a child in Nigeria. Despite this, she did not believe she was on the road to an acting path, feeling as though she was one of the least favourites in her drama class at Millfield. She has instead credited her dance teacher for instilling confidence in her, stating: "She saw something in me I did not see in myself, and she pushed me harder than the other dancers in Bazique to do more ballet exams in a year than anyone else at the time. So, she and I had a lot of private lessons over break and lunch times."

Oni then attended the University of Southampton, where she studied economics. Whilst there, she was part of various dance and theatre groups, as well as being the president of the Jazz dance society. She went on to study at the London School of Economics, where she studied economic history, as well as participating in their drama society. She then worked at Deloitte for three years as a management consultant.

In 2016, Oni made her professional acting debut in the film Housefull 3. She continued to make various film and television appearances, including roles in Years and Years, The Witcher and Hanna. Then in 2023, she was cast in the Netflix docudrama series African Queens: Njinga. She portrayed Queen Njinga. A year later, she was cast in the BBC medical drama series Casualty. She made her first appearance as Ngozi Okoye, a staff nurse, on 6 January 2024. Oni was the centre of a high-profile storyline in which her character was revealed to be an alcoholic, suffering various relapses, as well as her tumultuous relationship with Nicole Piper (Sammy Dobson).

== Filmography ==
Year	Title	Role	Notes
2016	Housefull 3	Margarett	Film
2016	Simana	Applicant	Film
2018	My Mother's Stew	Narrator	Short film
2018	The Killer Beside Me	Kelli Harris	Episode: "The Evil Inside"
2018	Prototype	Aurelia	Film
2018	No Shade	Jade	Film
2019	The Cloaking	Agent Okoye	Film
2019	Years and Years	Nigerian Woman	1 episode
2019	The Witcher	Téa	Episode: "Rare Species"
2020	Hanna	Guard	Episode: "A Way to Grieve"
2020	The Suit Weareth the Man	J	Short film
2020	Talia Versus	Celeste	Episode: "Talia Versus Wedding"
2021	400 Bullets	Espinosa	Film
2023	Operation Napoleon	Julie Ratoff	Film
2023	African Queens: Njinga	Queen Njinga	Main role
2024–2026	Casualty	Ngozi Okoye	Main role
