= African Queens =

2023 Netflix docudrama

- Genre: Docudrama
- Written by: Peres Owino; Nnenne Iwuji
- Directed by: Ethosheia Hylton; Tina Gharavi
- Starring: Adesuwa Oni; Adele James
- Narrated by: Jada Pinkett Smith
- Music by: Michael 'Mikey' J Asante
- Countries of origin: United States; United Kingdom
- Original language: English
- No. of seasons: 2
- No. of episodes: 8

Production
- Executive producers: Sahara Bushue; Terence Carter; Ben Goold; Miguel Melendez; Jada Pinkett Smith; Jane Root; Maxine Watson
- Producers: Ben Fox; Jonathan Phillips
- Cinematography: Sean Francis
- Running time: 45 minutes
- Production companies: Nutopia; Westbrook

Original release
- Network: Netflix
- Release: February 15 – May 10, 2023

African Queens is a 2023 docudrama series focusing on female monarchs, airing on the streaming service Netflix. The series is produced and narrated by Jada Pinkett Smith and features dramatized fictional re-enactments as well as interviews with experts. The first season covers Njinga, Queen of Ndongo and Matamba, and is directed by Ethosheia Hylton. The second season focuses on Queen of the Ptolemaic Kingdom of Egypt, Pharaoh Cleopatra VII Philopator, and is directed by Tina Gharavi.

== Summary ==
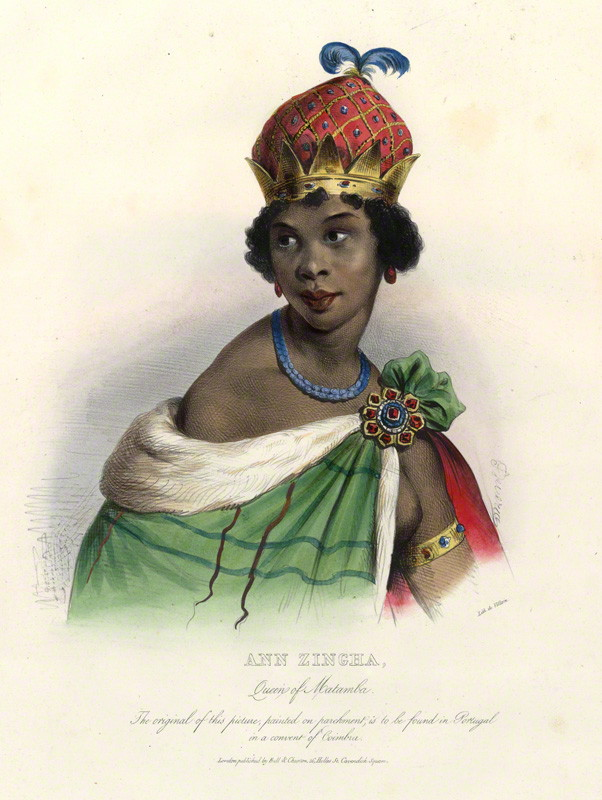
Drawing of Nzinga of Ndongo and Matamba in Luanda, Angola

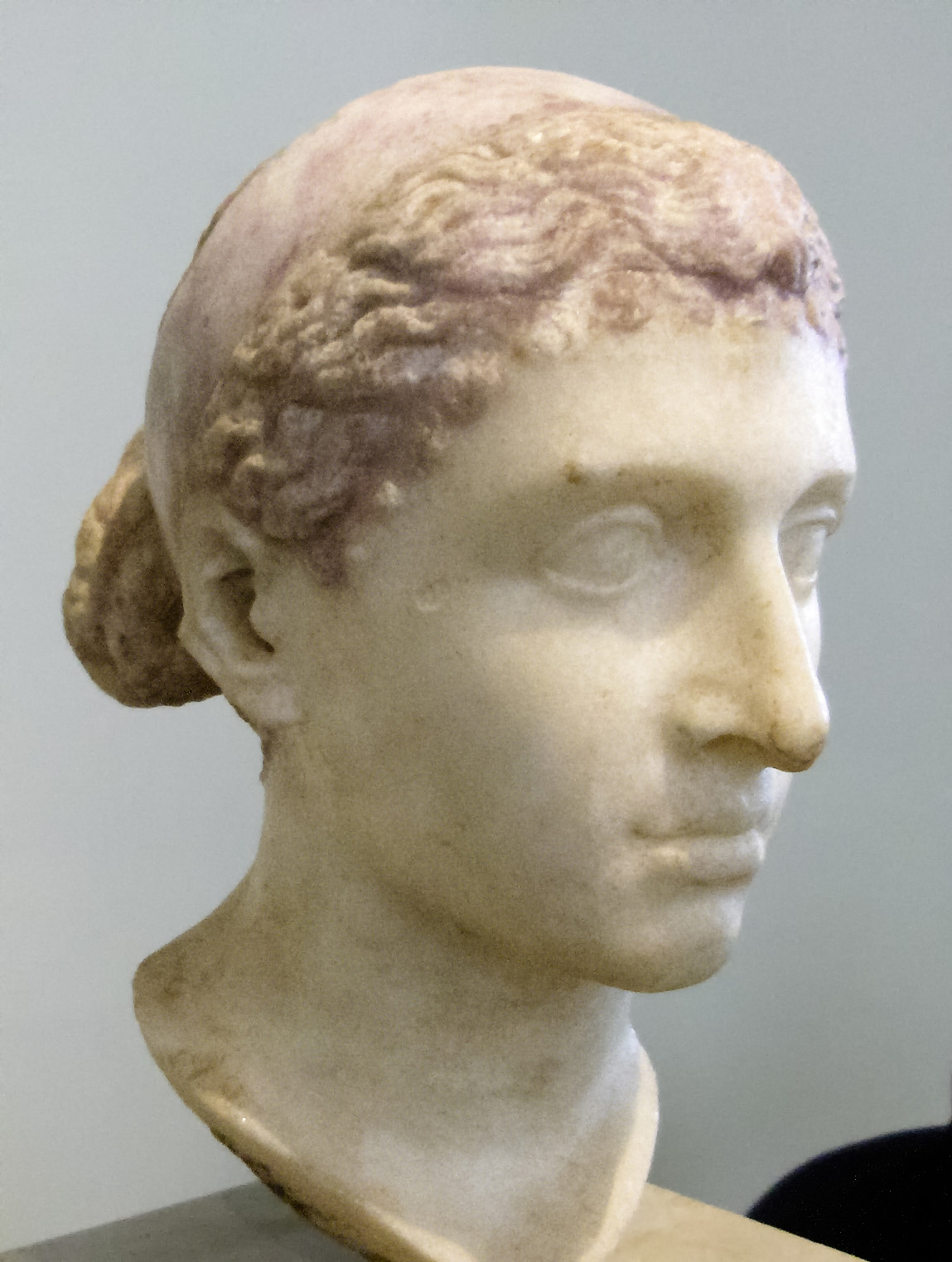
The Berlin Cleopatra, a Roman sculpture of Cleopatra wearing a royal diadem, mid-1st century BC.

The docudrama series combines dramatic recreations with interviews with historians and people from the modern-day regions that the Queen ruled over. Producer Jada Pinkett Smith cited a lack of stories covering Black queens as her inspiration for helming the series. She said: "We don't often get to see or hear stories about Black queens, and that was really important for me, as well as for my daughter, and just for my community to be able to know those stories because there are tons of them."

For the first season, the life of Njinga, Queen of Ndongo and Matamba, is explored. Interviewees include Kellie Carter Jackson, Wellesley College associate professor in the Department of Africana Studies; Diambi Kabatusuila, the present-day traditional Queen of the Bakwa Luntu people in Central Kasaï; and Rosa Cruz e Silva, the former director of the National Archives of Angola.

The second season explores the reign of Cleopatra, queen of the Ptolemaic Kingdom of Egypt. Postdoctorate Black feminist and Classicist Professor Shelley P. Haley was interviewed for the second season.

== Cast ==
=== African Queens: Njinga (2023) ===
- Adesuwa Oni as Queen Njinga
- Eshe Asante as Ndambi
- Marilyn Nnadebe as Funji
- Chipo Kureya as Kambu
- Philips Nortey as King Mbande

=== Queen Cleopatra (2023) ===
- Adele James as Cleopatra
- Craig Russell as Mark Antony
- John Partridge as Julius Caesar
- James Marlowe as Octavian
- Andira Crichlow as Arsinoe

== Episodes ==
=== Season overview ===
Season	Episodes	Originally released
1	4	February 15, 2023
2	4	May 10, 2023

=== African Queens: Njinga ===
No. overall	No. in season	Title	Directed by	Written by	Original release date
1	1	"Death of a King"	Ethosheia Hylton	Peres Owino	February 15, 2023
The life of Njinga prior to her accession, including her relationship with the Portuguese Empire's growing influence over her home.
2	2	"Power is Not Given"	Ethosheia Hylton	Peres Owino	February 15, 2023
Njinga's brother and king of Ndongo, Mbandi, dies, thrusting Njinga into a powerful position.
3	3	"The Blood Oath"	Ethosheia Hylton	Nnenne Iwuji	February 15, 2023
Njinga must make sacrifices and deals in order to solidify her power, marrying an Imbangala warlord Kasanje.
4	4	"Legacy"	Ethosheia Hylton	Nnenne Iwuji	February 15, 2023
Njinga negotiates with the Portuguese to recognize her kingdom as independent.

=== Queen Cleopatra ===
No. overall	No. in season	Title	Directed by	Written by	Original release date
5	1	"Rivals"	Tina Gharavi	Peres Owino	May 10, 2023
Cleopatra ascends the throne and her siblings vie for power as Julius Caesar meets her.
6	2	"When in Rome"	Tina Gharavi	Peres Owino	May 10, 2023
The birth of Caesarion and assassination plots shape Cleopatra's reign and relationship with Rome.
7	3	"What Must Be Done"	Tina Gharavi	Nnenne Iwuji	May 10, 2023
Cleopatra forges a relationship with Caesar's rival Mark Antony and Cleopatra participates in the Battle of Actium.
8	4	"The Last Pharaoh"	Tina Gharavi	Nnenne Iwuji	May 10, 2023
Octavian and the Roman army target Egypt. Cleopatra dies.

== Release ==
The first season premiered on February 15, 2023. The second season premiered on May 10, 2023. With the release of each season, all episodes were released simultaneously on Netflix.

== Reception ==
=== African Queens: Njinga ===
On the review aggregator website Rotten Tomatoes, 88% of 8 critics' reviews are positive, with an average rating of 7.3/10. Metacritic assigned African Queens: Njinga a weighted average score of 69 out of 100, based on 5 critics, indicating "generally favorable reviews". Ellen E. Jones of The Guardian was critical of the first series, awarding it 2 out of 5 stars, saying that "This tale of a 17th-century African female ruler features impressive academics, but they're drowned out by poor-quality dramatic sequences. It lacks context, analysis or personality." Angie Han of The Hollywood Reporter was also critical, saying that the format limited the ability to go deeply into the subject. Richard Roeper of the Chicago Sun-Times, however, praised the first series and gave it three out of four stars, saying while the "jazzy score and sometimes melodramatic dialogue occasionally [interrupts] the moment[, the show] keeps us involved and heats up the often violence-soaked drama in subsequent episodes". Luke Peppa of the Financial Times exclaims that, as in Njinga, with greater exposure to stories featuring African histories and myths, one might "even be inspired to create their own Africa-centric stories, [having a] wealth of stories that are yet to be told."

=== Queen Cleopatra ===
On the review aggregator website Rotten Tomatoes, 18% of 17 critics' reviews are positive, with an average rating of 4.6/10. The website's critics' consensus reads, "Queen Cleopatra may posit some fresh speculation about the ubiquitous monarch, but its glossy presentation errs more towards a superficial toga party than a substantive endeavor." Metacritic assigned Queen Cleopatra a weighted average score of 45 out of 100, based on 5 critics, indicating "mixed or average reviews". Anita Singh of The Daily Telegraph gave it 2 out of 5 stars, saying, "It's too soapy for serious history fans, and not enough of a soap for viewers who like juicy historical dramas." The Indian Express writer Rohan Naahar says that "you don't quite get an idea of who Cleopatra was as a person[...] She's projected, funnily enough, as a Beyonce-like figure." Naahar criticized the production design of the show, saying that Queen Cleopatra "[didn't] feature a single archive photograph of the palaces in which she lived, or of her many sculptures, or even paintings of her most famous conquests — both geographical and romantic."

==== Controversy ====
Cleopatra was played by the English actress Adele James, who is of Jamaican and English descent, in the second season's dramatic reenactment scenes. The choice to cast a Black actress caused controversy due to the controversy over Cleopatra's race.

The Egyptian government responded negatively to the casting decision. Egypt's Ministry of Antiquities stated that the series represented a "falsification of Egyptian history." The Secretary General of the Supreme Council of Archeology through the Egyptian Ministry of Tourism and Antiquities released a statement on the issue, claiming that Queen Cleopatra was "light-skinned and (had) Hellenic features." They cited Roman and Ptolemaic Greek coins, statues, and other depictions of Cleopatra as evidence, adding his complaint was "far from any ethnic racism." Former antiquities minister and Egyptologist Zahi Hawass was critical of the second season. He said, "This is completely fake. Cleopatra was a Macedonian Greek, meaning that she was light skinned, not black," adding that "Netflix is trying to provoke confusion by spreading false and deceptive facts that the origin of the Egyptian civilisation is black."

On May 9, 2023, CBS News interviewed Monica Hanna, an Egyptologist, who expressed her discontent with the film because "it is pushing an Afrocentric agenda ... imposing the identity politics of the 21st century and appropriating the ancient Egyptian past, just as the Eurocentrists and the far-right in Europe are doing". She further added that ancient Egypt "was more of a culture than it was a race."

On May 14, 2023, Sara Khorshid, a doctoral candidate at Western University in Canada, criticized some responses to the media as "antiblack racism", but saying this "should not detract from legitimate criticisms of the show" as showing a Western and Orientalist bias in its depiction of Egypt.

On April 21, 2023, the director Gharavi defended the casting, stating, "Doing the research, I realized what a political act it would be to see Cleopatra portrayed by a Black actress," but insisted that "what the historians can confirm is that it is more likely that Cleopatra looked like Adele than Elizabeth Taylor ever did."

Islam Issa, a philosopher and the only Egyptian voice in the documentary, expressed disappointment in Gharavi's politicizing of the casting.

Producers of the series stated that Cleopatra's ethnicity "is not the focus of Queen Cleopatra, but we did intentionally decide to depict her of mixed ethnicity to reflect theories about Cleopatra's possible Egyptian ancestry and the multicultural nature of ancient Egypt."

Adele James questioned the validity of the concept of "blackwashing" and expressed her disappointment with racial perceptions "that people are either so self-loathing or so threatened by Blackness that they feel the need to do that, to separate Egypt from the rest of the continent".
