= Adele James =

British actress and screenwriter

- Born: 20 March 1994 (age 32)
- Occupation: Actress
- Known for: Queen Cleopatra

Adele James (born 20 March 1994) is a British actress and screenwriter. She plays Tina Mollett in the TV series, Casualty. In 2023, James starred in the Netflix docuseries, Queen Cleopatra.

== Life ==
James became interested in acting in high school. Her father is Jamaican and her mother is English. James studied at the Richmond upon Thames College and the University of Bristol.

In 2018, she was the screenwriter of the short film, Last Call. She plays Tina Mollett in the TV series, Casualty. In 2023, she was given the starring role as Cleopatra in the second installment of Netflix's African Queens docuseries, Queen Cleopatra. Her casting faced controversy surrounding the Cleopatra race controversy.
