= Ethnicity of Cleopatra =

Debate on the race of the Egyptian ruler

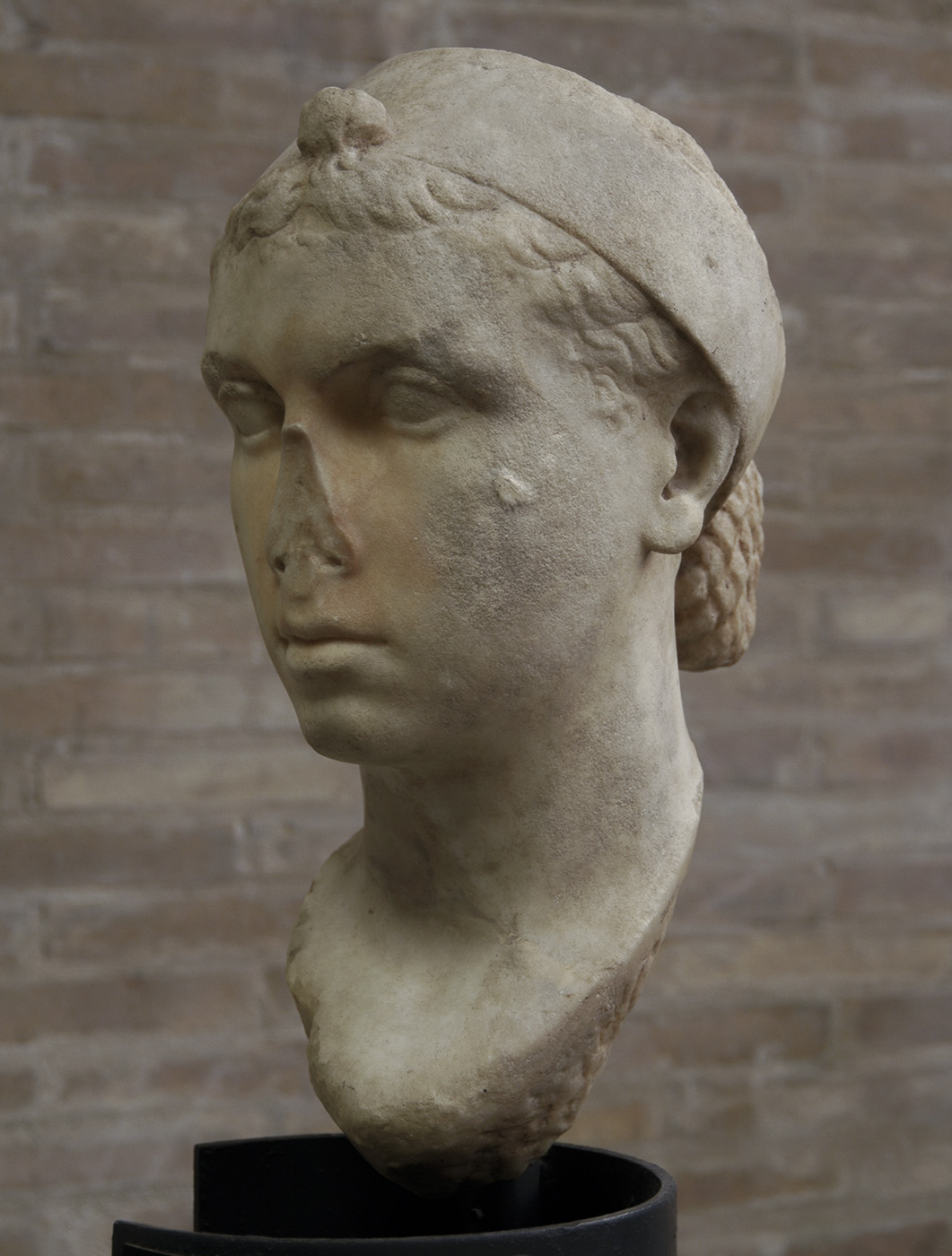
A bust of Cleopatra VII dated to 40–30 BC, now located at the Vatican Museums, showing her with a "melon" hairstyle and a Hellenistic royal diadem

The ethnicity of Cleopatra VII, the last active Hellenistic ruler of the Macedonian-led Ptolemaic Kingdom of Egypt, has caused debate in some circles. There is a general consensus among scholars that she was predominantly of Macedonian Greek ancestry and may have had minor Iranian descent (Sogdian and Persian). Others, including some scholars and laymen, have speculated whether she may have had additional backgrounds.

For example, the article "Was Cleopatra Black?" was published in Ebony magazine in 2002. Mary Lefkowitz, the professor emerita of Classical Studies at Wellesley College, traces the main origins of the Black Cleopatra claim to the 1946 book by Joel Augustus Rogers called World's Great Men of Color, although noting that the idea of Cleopatra as black goes back to at least the 19th century. Lefkowitz refutes Rogers' hypothesis, on various scholarly grounds. The black Cleopatra claim was further revived in an essay by Afrocentrist author John Henrik Clarke, chair of African history at Hunter College, entitled "African Warrior Queens". Lefkowitz notes the essay includes the claim that Cleopatra described herself as black in the New Testament's Book of Acts – when in fact Cleopatra had died more than sixty years before the death of Jesus. Some early twentieth century scholars speculated Cleopatra was part Jewish, but this hypothesis did not last into later twentieth century historiography.

Scholars generally identify Cleopatra as having been essentially of Greek ancestry with some Persian and Sogdian ancestry, based on the fact that her Macedonian Greek family (the Ptolemaic dynasty) had intermarried with the Seleucid dynasty. (Note: For further validation about Cleopatra VII being of predominantly Macedonian Greek descent, see Samson (1990, p. 104), Schiff (2011, pp. 2, 35–36, 42), Preston (2009, pp. 22, 77), Kleiner (2005, p. 22), Prose (2022, p. 8), Watterson (2020, pp. 15), Fletcher (2008, p. 1), Bradford (2003, pp. 14, 17), Lefkowitz (1992, pp. 34–52), Bianchi (2005), and Southern (2009, pp. 43).) Cleopatra's official coinage (which she would have approved) and the three portrait busts of her considered authentic by scholars (which match her coins) portray Cleopatra as a Greek woman in style, although the Cherchell bust is now largely considered by scholars to be that of Cleopatra's daughter, Cleopatra Selene II. Francisco Pina Polo writes that Cleopatra's coinage presents her image with certainty and asserts that the sculpted portrait of the "Berlin Cleopatra" head is confirmed as having a similar profile. Roman frescoes in Pompeii and Herculaneum similar to the Vatican and Berlin marble sculptures have been identified as possible portraits of the queen based on comparable facial features and royal iconography.

In 2009, a BBC documentary speculated that Cleopatra might have been part North African. This was based largely on the examination of a headless skeleton of a female child in a 20 BCE tomb in Ephesus (present-day Turkey), together with the old notes and photographs of the now-missing skull. The remains were hypothesized to be those of Arsinoe IV, sister or half-sister to Cleopatra, and conjecture based on discredited processes suggested that the remains belonged to a girl whose "race" may have been "North African". This claim is rejected by scholars, based on the remains being impossible to identify as Arsinoe, the race of the remains being impossible to identify at all, the fact that the remains belonged to a child much younger than Arsinoe when she died, and the fact that Arsinoe and Cleopatra shared the same father, Ptolemy XII Auletes, but may have had different mothers. A 2025 study ultimately proved that the Ephesus skeleton belonged to a boy, disproving the identification as Arsinoe.

== Background ==
The race and skin color of Cleopatra VII, the last active Hellenistic ruler of the Macedonian Greek Ptolemaic dynasty of Egypt, has caused some debate, although generally not in scholarly sources. For example, the article "Was Cleopatra Black?" was published in Ebony magazine in 2002, and an article about Afrocentrism from the St. Louis Post-Dispatch mentions the question, too.

Classicist Grace Macurdy notes in her seminal 1932 book Hellenistic Queens: A Study of Woman-Power in Macedonia, Seleucid Syria, and Ptolemaic Egypt that scholars prior to her book had speculated Cleopatra was part Jewish, a hypothesis which Macurdy dismisses as having "slight evidence." The evidence cited for this hypothesis has included antisemitic readings into Cleopatra's iconography (mainly, Cleopatra's nose), modern speculation about her legitimacy, Cleopatra's ability to speak the language of the Hebrews, and the centuries-long patronage of Jewish Alexandrians by the Ptolemies, including Cleopatra. The speculation of Cleopatra being part Jewish did not survive into later twentieth century historiography of the queen.

Mary Lefkowitz, Professor Emerita of Classical Studies at Wellesley College, traces the main origins of the black Cleopatra claim to the 1946 book by J.A. Rogers called World's Great Men of Color, although noting that the idea of Cleopatra as black goes back to at least the 19th century. Lefkowitz refutes Rogers' hypothesis. She notes Rogers's inability to correctly number Cleopatra's family (for example, naming Cleopatra's brother Ptolemy XIII Theos Philopator as her father, who was Ptolemy XII Auletes, and naming Ptolemy XI Alexander II as Ptolemy XII's father when he was Ptolemy IX Soter), using as his main sources a misinterpretation of William Shakespeare's Antony and Cleopatra (written over 1,500 years after Cleopatra's death) and falsely citing Encyclopedia Britannica (when in fact it did not then or ever claim Cleopatra was black), and that his presumption Cleopatra's paternal grandmother was a black slave is "based in the more recent past".

She further stresses slavery in ancient times was very different from modern chattel slavery, as slaves were not taken based on skin color but were in actuality mostly war captives, largely including Greeks, and notes Roger's claim of a black grandmother is based on practices by slave owners of the 19th century. The black Cleopatra claim, Lefkowitz continues, was further revived in an essay written by afrocentrist John Henrik Clarke, chair of African history at Hunter College, entitled "African Warrior Queens" for "Black Women in Antiquity."

She notes the essay was largely drawn on the writings of Rogers with Clarke's added "supporting information of his own" that includes his claim Cleopatra described herself as black in the New Testament's Book of Acts – when in fact Cleopatra had died more than sixty years before the death of Jesus. She also notes that if Cleopatra's paternal grandmother was Egyptian and if that is how she learned Egyptian, it would be more likely for Cleopatra's father Ptolemy XII to be the first Ptolemy to learn Egyptian instead of Cleopatra (noting those like Rogers and Clarke never mention him), who is the only member of the Ptolemaic dynasty known to have learned Egyptian in addition to her native tongue Koine Greek and eight other languages.

In her 1993 paper "Black Feminist Thought and Classics: Re-Membering, Re-Claiming, Re-Empowering," classicist Shelley P. Haley discusses Cleopatra from a Black feminist perspective in which she sees the queen as a symbolic figure for African-American women. She writes that "Cleopatra reacted to the phenomena of oppression and exploitation as a Black woman would." Thus, African-American audiences claim Cleopatra as a 'sister.' Mary Lefkowitz responded to Haley by noting that the historical Cleopatra VII was not a victim but rather a Hellenistic despotic ruler who lost a "closely matched struggle for power." When prompted on Lefkowitz's criticism of her 1993 article, Haley further argued in favor of Cleopatra symbolizing for African-American women "the treatment we have received at the hands of Eurocentric patriarchy."

In regard to the question of the race of the historical Cleopatra, Haley responded "that this is a very complex question when one can ask it about Cleopatra or any ancient – or modern – historical figure." In addition to being a symbolic figure in American Black feminism, Cleopatra became an icon for Egyptian audiences over centuries as well as in the modern age for the Arab and Egyptian nationalist movements. As a national icon for Egyptians, Cleopatra has been seen by such figures as Ahmed Shawqi as representative of the conflict between Egypt and imperialist European powers. (As pointed out by historian Adrian Goldsworthy, however, if there had been any 'great struggle' of civilizations in the historical Cleopatra VII's lifetime, it was "not between east and west, but Greek and Roman".)

In response to the book Not Out of Africa by Lefkowitz, Molefi Kete Asante, Professor of African American Studies at Temple University wrote the article "Race in Antiquity: Truly Out of Africa", in which he emphasized that he "can say without a doubt that Afrocentrists do not spend time arguing that either Socrates or Cleopatra were black."

More recently Kathryn A. Bard, Professor of Archaeology and Classical Studies at Boston University stated in 2020 that: "Cleopatra was white of Macedonian descent, as were all of the Ptolemy rulers, who lived in Egypt," while for Rebecca Futo Kennedy, Associate Professor of Classics, Women's and Gender Studies, and Environmental Studies at Denison University, since there is no genetic basis for race, any claims to being able to identify Cleopatra's "true racial background" from her family tree perpetuate nothing else but a modern political position. For Dame Mary Beard, Professor of Classics at the University of Cambridge and scholar of Ancient Roman civilisation, "The truth is that we have no idea of the origins of Cleopatra. She was certainly of a royal Macedonian family, but whether her mother (or any other of her female ancestors) was Egyptian we just don't know."

In regard to the debate surrounding the casting in 2020 of Israeli actress Gal Gadot in a Cleopatra film project, Egyptian-Australian writer and journalist Daniel Nour contended Egyptians should have a say who is cast as Cleopatra, as she was a "queen of Egyptian history." In the context of Egyptian feminism, Nour argues that for Egyptian women "the choice to cast an Egyptian woman in a role like Cleopatra can be incredibly empowering." He continues that since Cleopatra is an Egyptian queen of Greek ancestry, she is representative of the genetic diversity of modern Egypt. He further notes the importance of Egyptian feminist Nawal El Saadawi's identifying Cleopatra's role in Egyptian history as part of "historical demonstrations of the matriarchal power structures held by North-African women."

The exclusion of Cleopatra's Greek-ness from mainstream Hollywood productions has also been recently discussed by Greek scholars: Greek historian Konstantinos P. Nikoloutsos, in his anthology Ancient Greek Women in Film (2013), includes a chapter written by the classicist Lloyd Llewellyn-Jones entitled "'An Almost All Greek Thing': Cleopatra VII and Hollywood Imagination" (a reference to the famous 1963 film Cleopatra) which critiques the lack of representation of Greek culture in portrayals of Cleopatra.

The 2023 Netflix documentary series Queen Cleopatra, which cast a black actor of mixed English and Jamaican heritage as the queen, ignited controversy with accusations of historical inaccuracy, including from the former Minister of State for Antiquities Affairs Zahi Hawass. It spurred a lawsuit in Egypt stating that the documentary was distorting the reality in order to promote Afrocentrism, and that Netflix's programs were not in line with Egyptian or Islamic values. Rebecca Futo Kennedy contends that discussing whether someone was "black" or "white" is anachronistic, and that asking this question says "more about modern political investments than attempting to understand antiquity on its own terms".

== Known depictions ==
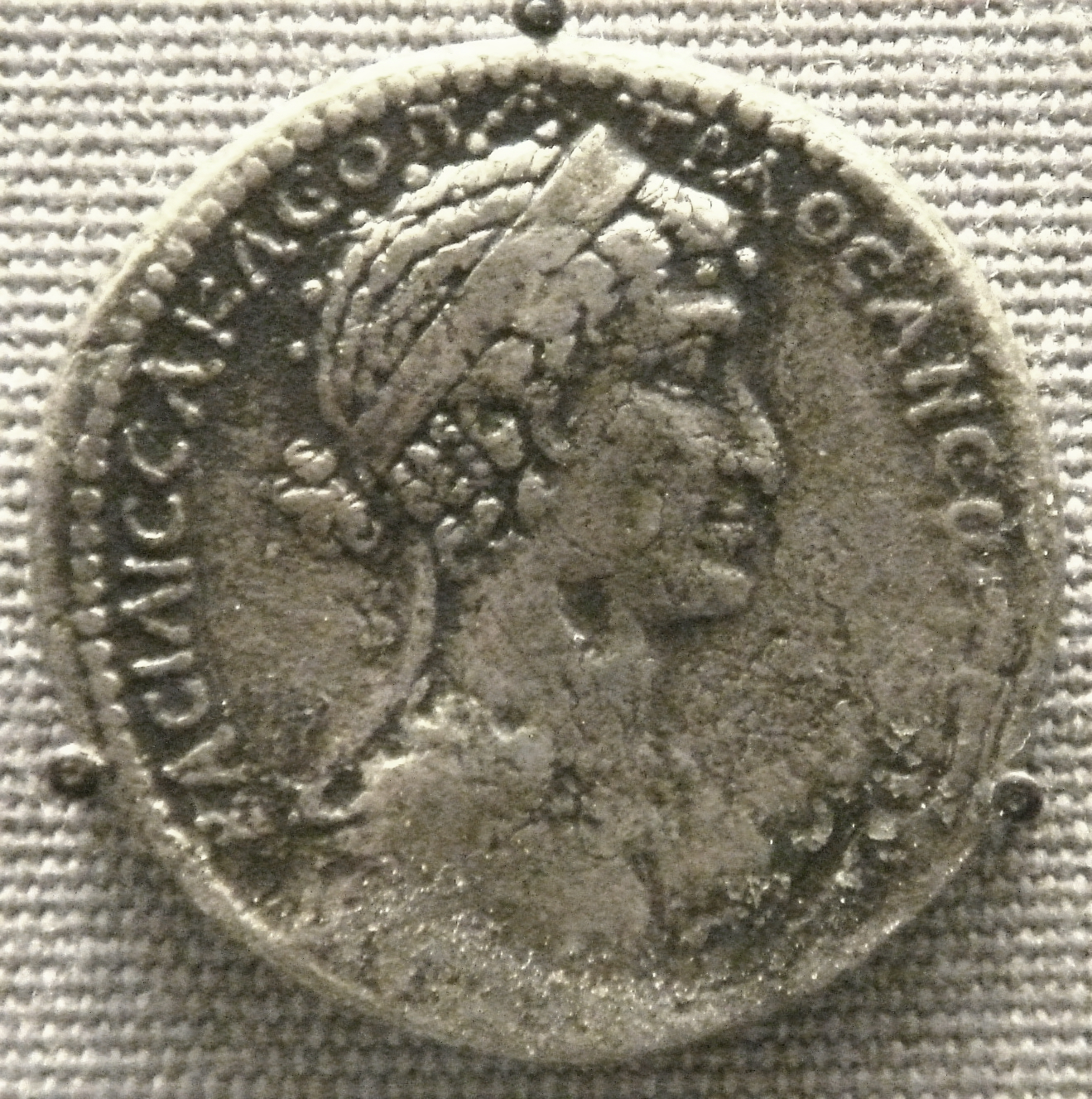
Coin portrait tetradrachm of and approved by Cleopatra VII Philopator with the Greek inscription: BACIΛICCA KΛEOΠATPA ΘEA NEΩTEPA, lit. "Queen Cleopatra, the younger goddess".

Cleopatra's official Ptolemaic coinage (which she would have approved) and the three Roman portrait busts of her considered authentic by scholars (which match her coins) portray Cleopatra as a Greek woman in style, including the Greek chiton, Hellenistic diadem, and Greek chignon. Francisco Pina Polo writes that Cleopatra's coinage present her image with certainty and asserts that the sculpted portrait of the "Berlin Cleopatra" head from the Altes Museum is confirmed as having a similar profile with her hair pulled back into a bun, a diadem, and a hooked nose.

Ernle Bradford writes that it is "reasonable to infer" Cleopatra had dark hair and "pale olive skin" by how she portrays herself as a "Eastern Mediterranean type" on her official coins, and that she challenged Rome not as an Egyptian woman, "but as a civilized Greek". Barbara Watterson notes that Cleopatra's coins show her in the Greek style rather than the Egyptian style and argues that although she was a Macedonian Greek we can only speculate the color of Cleopatra's features, but probably had dark brown hair and eyes and skin with an olive hue.

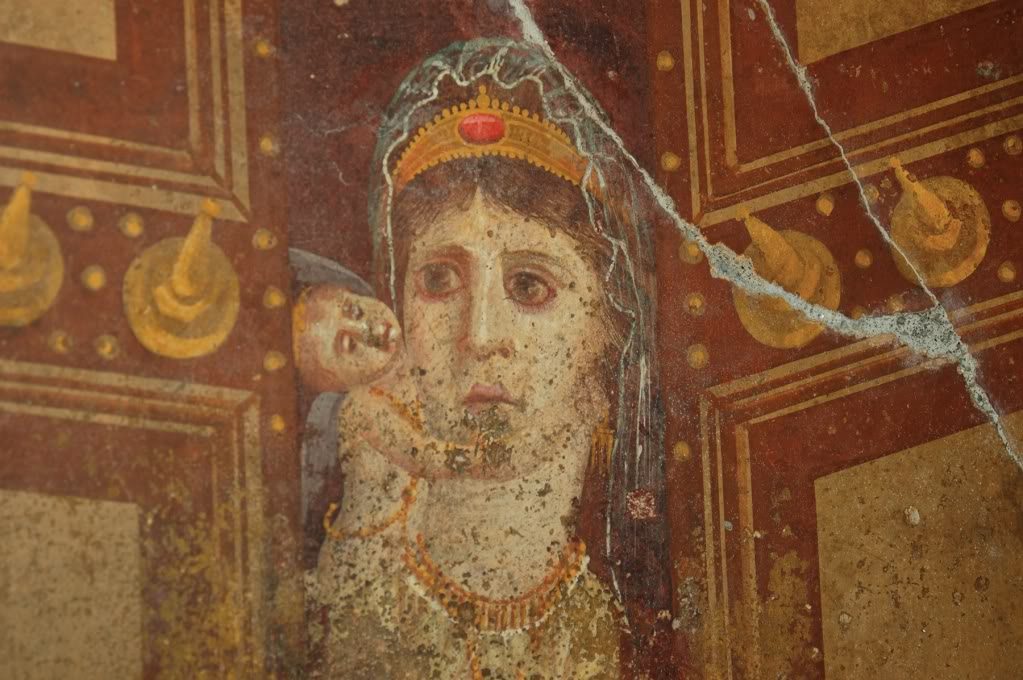
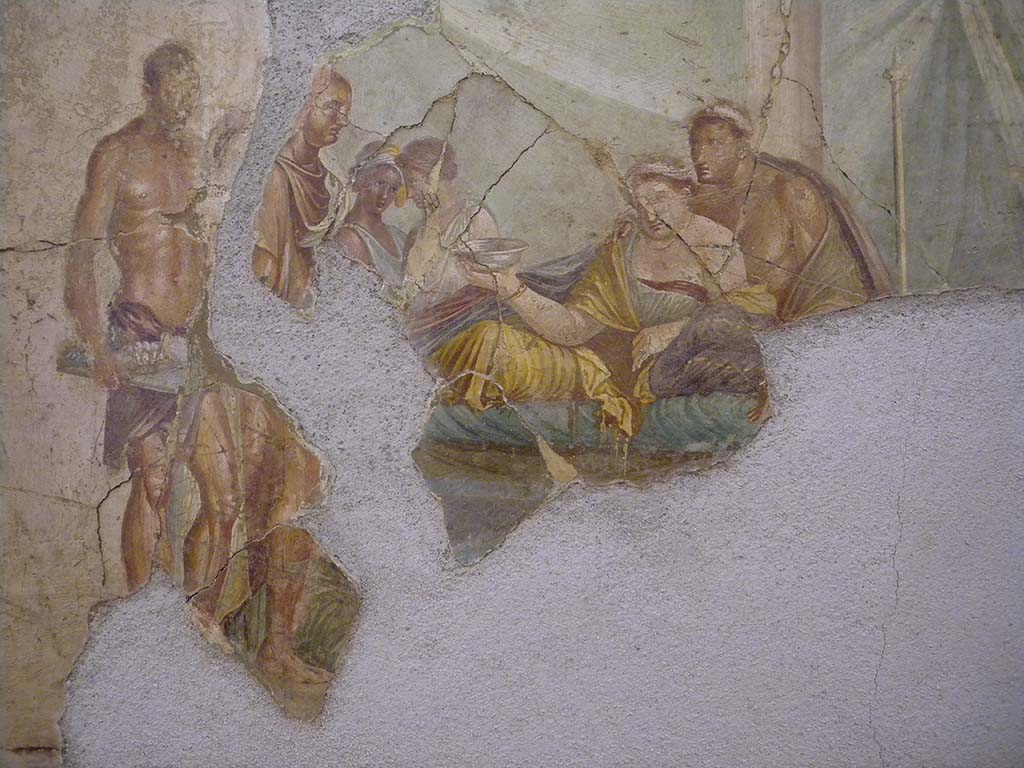
Left: a Roman Second Style painting in the House of Marcus Fabius Rufus at Pompeii, Italy, depicting Cleopatra as Venus Genetrix and her son Caesarion as a cupid, mid-1st century BC
Right: a Roman painting from the House of Giuseppe II in Pompeii, early 1st century AD, most likely depicting Cleopatra, wearing her royal diadem and consuming poison in an act of suicide, while her son Caesarion, also wearing a royal diadem, stands behind her

Similar to the Berlin Cleopatra, other Roman sculpted portraits of Cleopatra include diadem-wearing marble heads now located in the Vatican Museums and Archaeological Museum of Cherchell, although the latter may instead be a depiction of her daughter Cleopatra Selene II. The diademed 'Esquiline Venus' statue in the Capitoline Museums is also speculated as being an additional depiction of the queen, especially due to her connection with the Greek goddess Aphrodite as seen on some of her coinage. The Portland Vase, a Roman cameo glass vase dated to the reign of Augustus and now in the British Museum, includes a possible depiction of Cleopatra with a serpent rising in her lap as she sits and grasps the arm of her Roman spouse Mark Antony.

In addition to sculptures and coins, several surviving Roman frescoes from Pompeii and Herculaneum also likely depict Cleopatra. A contemporaneous depiction from Pompeii's House of Marcus Fabius Rufus depicts the queen as the goddess Venus Genetrix holding a cupid in her arms, ostensibly a rare depiction of her son Caesarion who was fathered by the Roman dictator Julius Caesar. Susan Walker notes that the woman's ivory-white skin, round face, long aquiline nose, and large round eyes were features common in Roman and Ptolemaic depictions of goddesses. In his argument that Cleopatra's beauty was as perilous to politics as Helen of Troy, the Roman poet Lucan wrote in his Pharsalia that Cleopatra emphasized the sight of her "white breasts" through her thinly veiled Oriental dress, comments likely meant to sexualize her than give an accurate depiction of her person.

Duane W. Roller writes about the Pompeian fresco: "there seems little doubt that this is a depiction of Cleopatra and Caesarion before the doors of the Temple of Venus in the Forum Julium and, as such, it becomes the only extant contemporary painting of the queen." Walker, Roller and Joann Fletcher observe the similarity of this Pompeiian painting with the face preserved in the "Vatican Cleopatra", the damage on the left cheek of the sculpture possibly from the arm of a cupid that may have been torn off.

Posthumous portraits include a fresco of Pompeii's House of Giuseppe II depicting her possible suicide by poisoning, a painted portrait in Pompeii's House of the Orchard showing a side view of her diademed bust, and a highly similar fresco from nearby Herculaneum, the latter which matches the visage of her sculptures and official coinage.

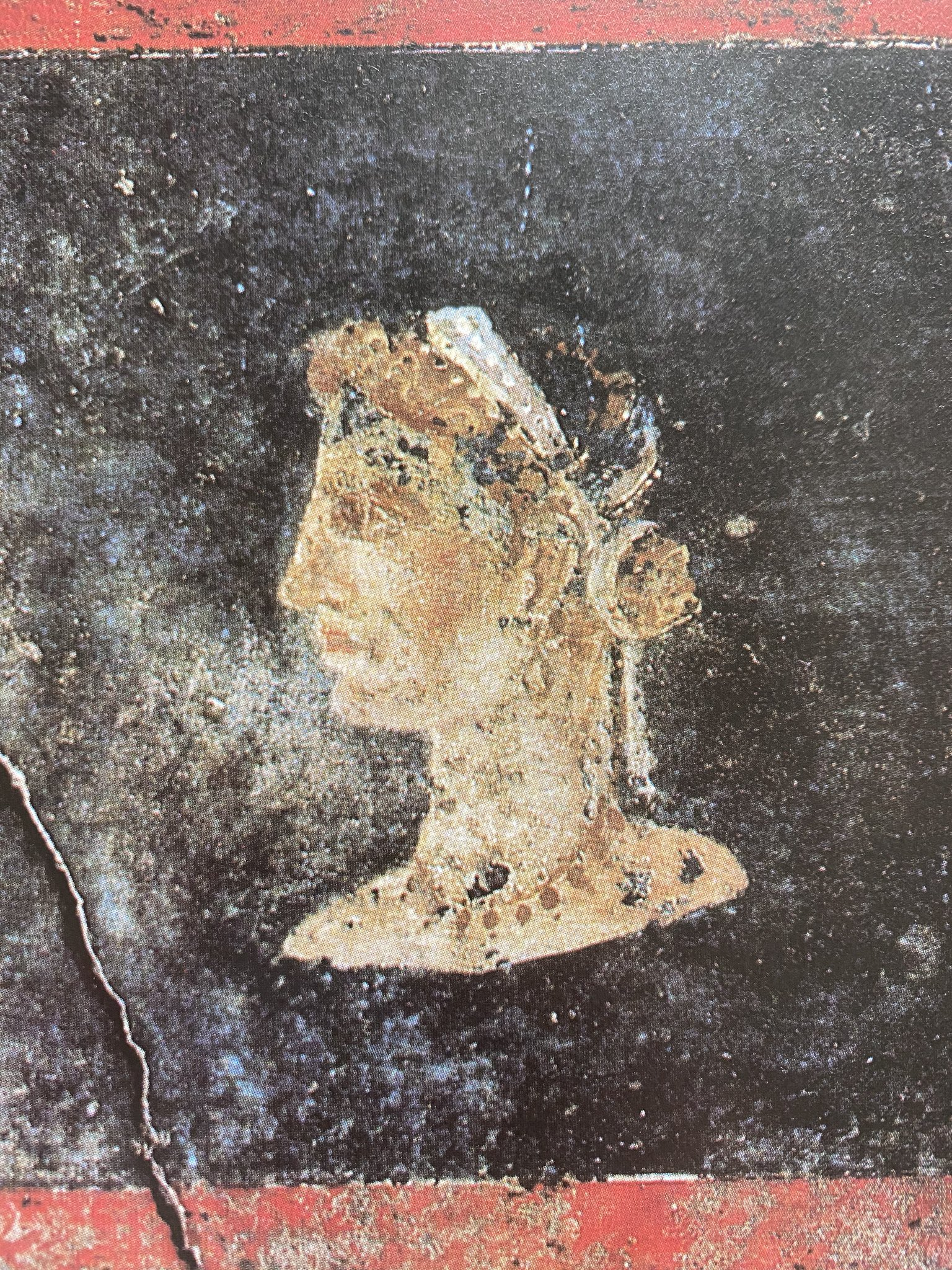
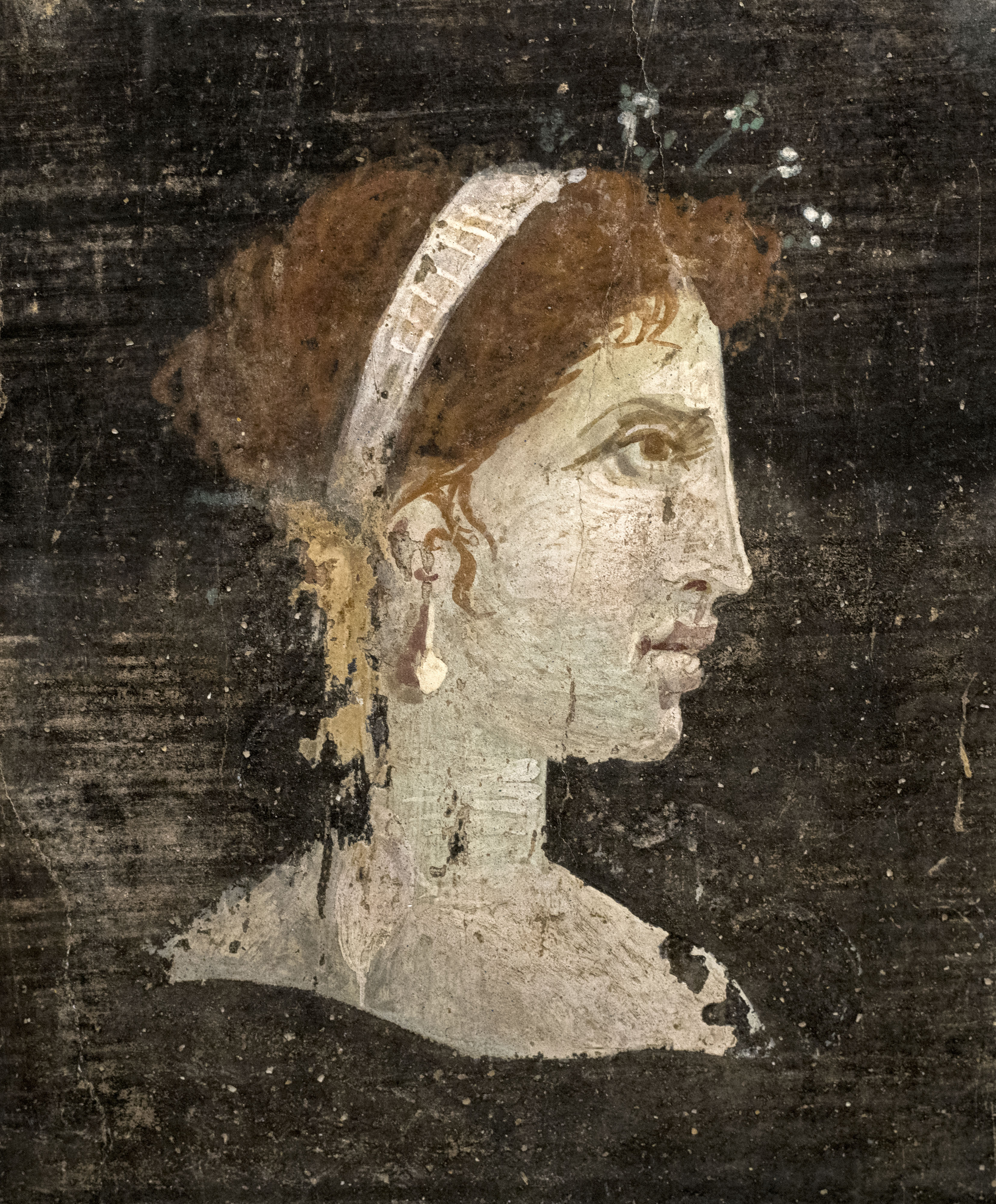
Left: Ancient Roman fresco in the Pompeian Third Style possibly depicting Cleopatra, from the House of the Orchard at Pompeii, Italy, mid-1st century AD;
Right: most likely a posthumously painted portrait of Cleopatra with red hair and her distinct facial features, wearing a royal diadem and pearl-studded hairpins, from Roman Herculaneum, Italy, 1st century AD
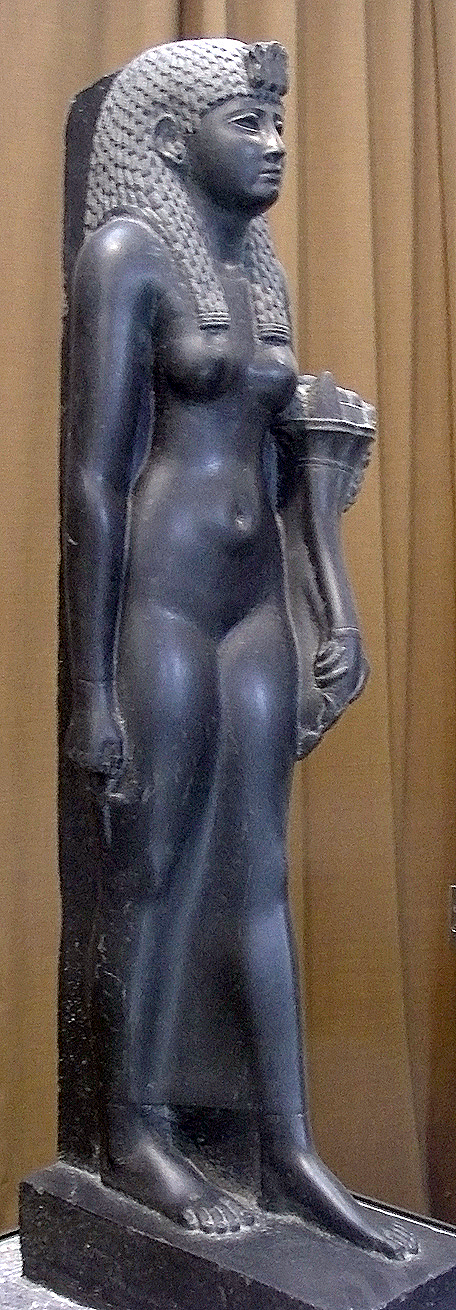
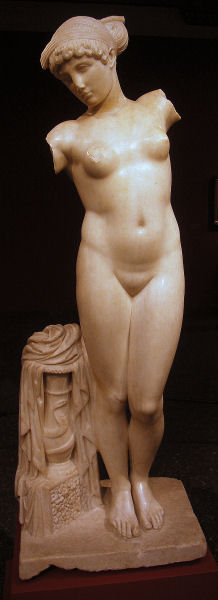
Left: An Egyptian statue of either Arsinoe II or Cleopatra as an Egyptian goddess in black basalt from the second half of the 1st century BC, located in the Hermitage Museum, Saint Petersburg
Right: The Esquiline Venus, a Roman or Hellenistic-Egyptian statue of Venus (Aphrodite) that may be a depiction of Cleopatra, located in the Capitoline Museums, Rome
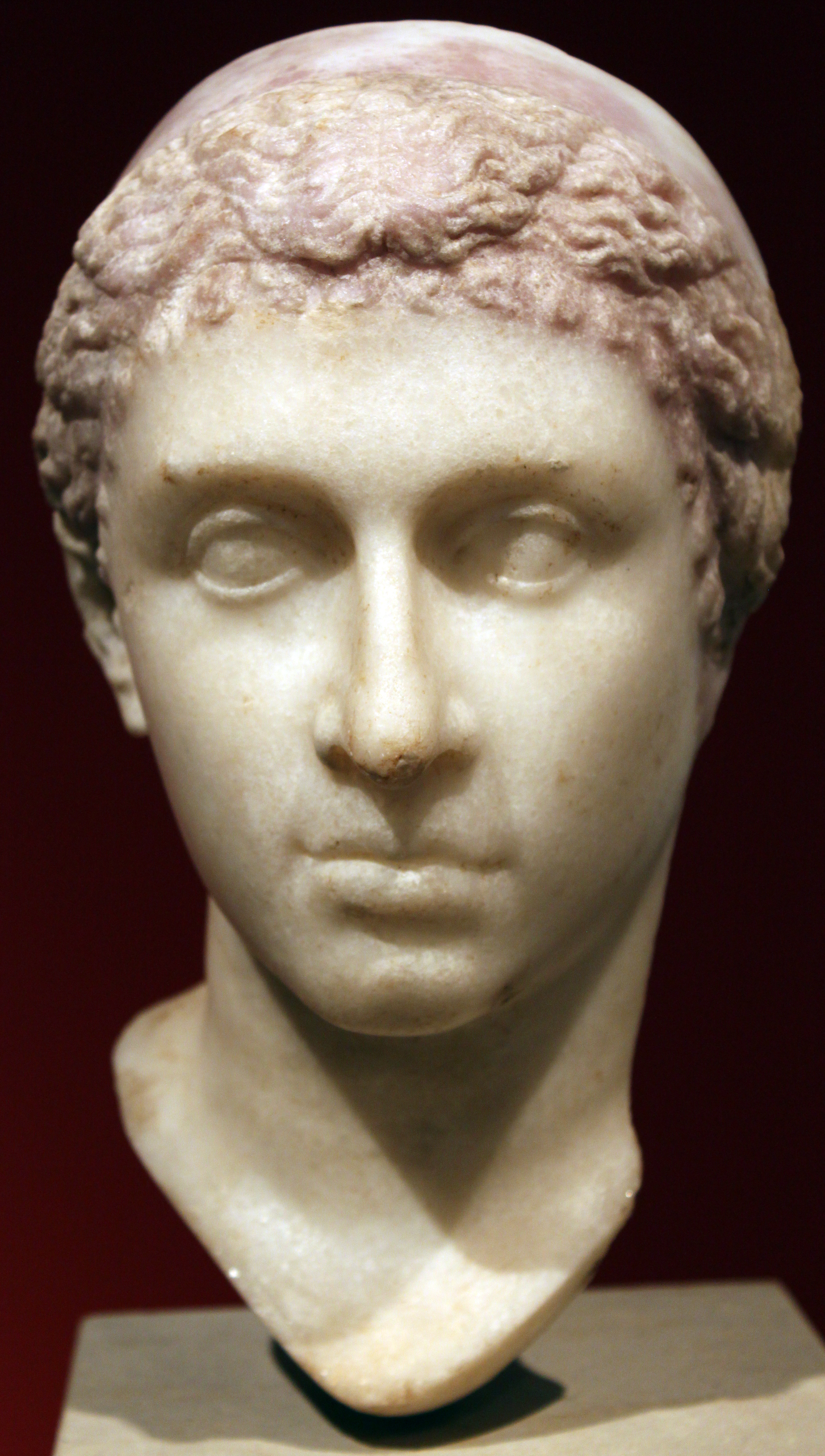
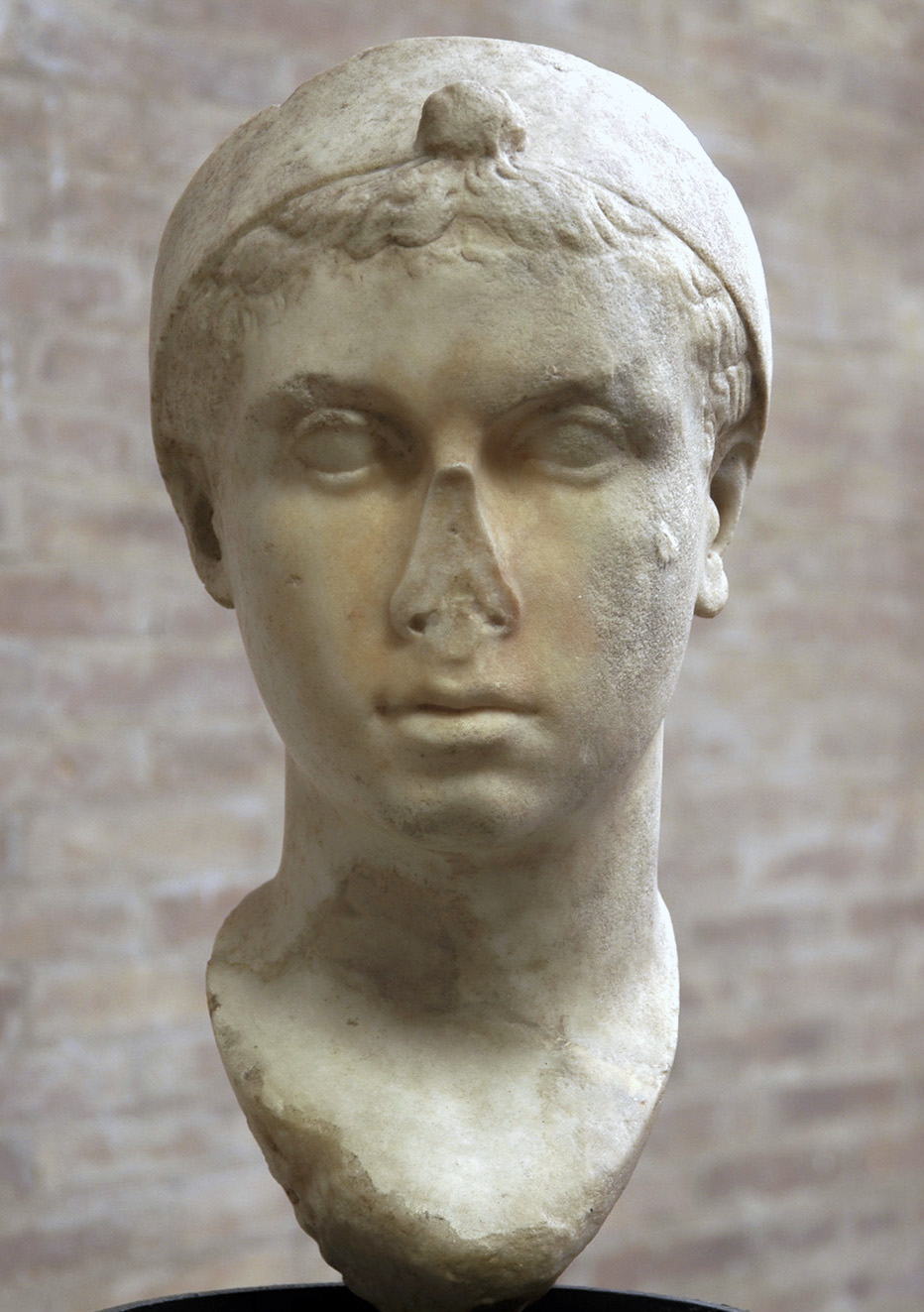
(left) Cleopatra VII bust in the Altes Museum, Antikensammlung Berlin, Roman artwork, mid-1st century BC; (right) Bust of Cleopatra VII, dated 40–30 BC, Vatican Museums, showing her with a "melon" hairstyle and Hellenistic royal diadem

Aside from Hellenistic art, native Egyptian artworks of Cleopatra include the Bust of Cleopatra in the Royal Ontario Museum, as well as stone-carved reliefs of the Temple of Hathor in the Dendera Temple complex in Egypt depicting Cleopatra and Caesarion as ruling pharaohs providing offerings to Egyptian deities. Other works include a large Ptolemaic black basalt statue now in the Hermitage Museum, Saint Petersburg, depicting an uncertain Ptolemaic queen thought to be either Arsinoe II or the famous Cleopatra VII.

In his Kleopatra und die Caesaren (2006), Bernard Andreae contends that this Egyptian basalt statue is like other idealized Egyptian portraits of the queen, and does not contain realistic facial features and hence adds little to the knowledge of Cleopatra's appearance. Diana Preston comes to a similar conclusion about native Egyptian depictions of Cleopatra: "Apart from certain temple carvings, which are anyway in a highly stylised pharaonic style and give little clue to Cleopatra's real appearance, the only certain representations of Cleopatra are those on coins. The marble head in the Vatican is one of three sculptures generally, though not universally, accepted by scholars to be depictions of Cleopatra." Barbara Watterson writes that the depictions of Cleopatra such as at Hathor are conventional Egyptian representations rather than actual portraits of the queen. She notes that the Dendera relief shows Cleopatra in the "typical Ptolemaic style".

Roger S. Bagnall has noted that those who attempt to make a strong case for Egyptian influence on the Ptolemaic dynasty themselves have "depicted in essence a use of Egyptian material for royal purposes", such as native Egyptian works of the Ptolemies, and thus are not indicative of an "Egyptianization" of the royal family. As pointed out by Elaine Fantham, "Although Cleopatra was heir to some ancient Egyptian traditions, she was not an anomaly in a long line of Greek queens."

== Ancestry ==
Scholars generally identify Cleopatra as having been essentially of Macedonian Greek ancestry with some distant Persian and Sogdian Iranian descent. This is based on the fact that her Macedonian Greek family – the Ptolemaic dynasty – had intermarried with the Macedonian Greek Seleucid dynasty that ruled over much of West Asia. Notably this included the first Ptolemaic Cleopatra, Queen Cleopatra I Syra, a Seleucid princess and daughter of Antiochus III the Great who married Ptolemy V Epiphanes. Cleopatra I Syra was a descendant of the Seleucid Queen Apama, the Sogdian Iranian wife of Seleucus I Nicator, a Macedonian Greek companion of Alexander the Great. Laodice III, the mother of Cleopatra I Syra, was born to king Mithridates II of Pontus and his wife Laodice, who had a mixed Greek and Persian ancestral heritage.

While the identity of Cleopatra VII Philopator's mother is uncertain, she is generally believed to be Cleopatra V of Egypt, the sister or cousin wife of Ptolemy XII Auletes, who was the daughter of Ptolemy IX Soter or Ptolemy X Alexander I. (Note: For further information and validation see Schiff (2011, p. 28), Kleiner (2005, p. 22), Bennett (1997, pp. 60–63), Bianchi (2005), Tyldesley (2008, pp. 40, 235–236), and Meadows (2001, p. 23). For alternative speculation, see Roller (2010, pp. 15, 18, 166). For a comparison of arguments about Cleopatra's maternity, see Prose (2022, p. 38).) Additionally, while the identity of her paternal grandmother is not certain, she is generally believed to be Cleopatra IV, via Ptolemy XII's father, Ptolemy IX Soter, or a Greek Alexandrian woman. Claims of illegitimacy were never used against Cleopatra in the extremely hostile propaganda campaign by Augustus, Michael Grant noting that if Cleopatra had been illegitimate, her "numerous Roman enemies would have revealed this to the world".

Grant states that Cleopatra probably had not a drop of Egyptian blood and that she "would have described herself as Greek". Moreover, he points out that her "whole education and culture" was Greek. Cleopatra's childhood tutor was the sophist Philostratos, from whom she learned the Greek arts of oration and philosophy. Grant also states that the queen was "consumed with perpetual ambition to revive the former glories of her Greek kingdom and house".

Grant proposes that Cleopatra's paternal grandmother may have been mixed Syrian and Greek, in line with the precedent of Seleucid Syrian royalty in the Ptolemaic line, and continues that "certainly she was not an Egyptian", noting there is no known Egyptian wife of a Ptolemaic king and there is only one known Egyptian mistress of a Ptolemy (from the 3rd century BCE).

Lefkowitz writes that this Egyptian woman, named Didyme, was the mistress of Ptolemy II Philadelphus. She notes that among Ptolemy II's many mistresses, Didyme was specifically singled out because she was Egyptian, and not of the usual Greek stock among Ptolemaic mistresses (who included among Ptolemy II's mistresses, the courtesans Bilistiche, Agathocleia, Stratonice of Libya, and Myrto – whose coloring and ethnicity were not specifically pointed out like Didyme, "presumably because they were Greek"). She further notes that if she had any children by Ptolemy, they never became king. She contends that it is "misleading to suggest that the unique non-Greek mistress Didyme provides evidence of a common practice".

Duane W. Roller speculates that Cleopatra VII could have been the daughter of a hypothetical half-Macedonian-Greek, half-Egyptian woman belonging to the priestly family of Ptah (the other main candidate he notes would be Cleopatra V/VI) located in Memphis in northern Egypt, but contends that whatever Cleopatra's ancestry, she valued her Greek Ptolemaic heritage the most. He further notes that "there is absolutely no evidence" that Cleopatra was racially black African as claimed by what he dismisses as generally not "credible scholarly sources". He goes on to say that outside the hypothesis of Cleopatra being three-quarters Macedonian Greek and a quarter Egyptian, there is "no room for anything else, certainly not for any black African blood". The speculation that Cleopatra was the daughter or granddaughter of a hypothetical woman of the priestly family of Ptah was first conjectured by Werner Huß, based upon a speculated earlier marriage between Psenptais II, high priest of Ptah, and a certain "Berenice", once argued to possibly be a daughter of Ptolemy VIII, based on funerary Stela of Pedubast III. However, the speculation of this marriage was refuted by Egyptologist Wendy Cheshire.

Diana Preston also writes that Cleopatra's paternal grandmother may have been part Syrian, continuing that even if Cleopatra had an Egyptian grandmother "it does not follow she was a black African" and that Cleopatra "almost certainly had olive skin and dark eyes". Adrian Goldsworthy notes Cleopatra, having Macedonian blood with a little Syrian, was probably not dark skinned (he also notes Roman propaganda never mentions it, although conceding this may simply be because the Romans found skin color unimportant), contending "fairer skin is marginally more likely considering her ancestry", and that she "was no more Egyptian culturally or ethnically than most residents of modern day Arizona are Apaches". Mary Lefkowitz notes that had Cleopatra's grandmother or mother been Egyptian, it surely would have been pointed out in the records, and concludes that whatever her ancestry, Cleopatra "regarded herself as Greek".

Jean Bingen points out that Cleopatra's second title Philopatris ('the one who loves her patris') clearly refers to her Macedonian ancestry, invoking the blood of both the Ptolemies and the Greek Seleucids. Goldsworthy further notes that Cleopatra's native tongue was Greek, that it was in "Greek literature and culture she that was educated", that her worship of Isis was "strongly Hellenised", and that although she was presented in some statuary in the idealized Egyptian style, she was unlikely to have dressed like this outside of performing certain rites. Instead, he continues, Cleopatra "wore the headband and robes of a Greek monarch".

Stacy Schiff concurs Cleopatra was not dark-skinned, that "the Ptolemies were in fact Macedonian Greek, which makes Cleopatra approximately as Egyptian as Elizabeth Taylor", that her Ptolemaic relatives were described as "honey skinned", that she was part Persian, and that "an Egyptian mistress is a rarity among the Ptolemies". Schiff continues that Cleopatra "faithfully held up the family tradition". In essence, Cleopatra's loyalties were to her Ptolemaic Greek heritage.

To Donald R. Dudley, Cleopatra and her family were "the successor[s] to the native Pharaohs, exploiting through a highly organized bureaucracy the great natural resources of the Nile Valley". For example, Ancient Greek scholar Athenaeus reports that Cleopatra gave away enslaved people, including "Aethiopian boys", to her dinner guests.

Joyce Tyldesley notes that while there were blonde Macedonian rulers, like Ptolemy II, Cleopatra's known Macedonian and Persian ancestry make it likely she had "dark hair and an olive or light brown complexion", although Joann Fletcher points it is very possible Cleopatra was actually red-headed, as depicted on the fresc in Herculaneum that shows "flame-haired woman wearing the royal diadem surrounded by Egyptian motifs which has been identified as Cleopatra". Tyldesley speculates that if her mother was not a Ptolemy, "she could have been an elite woman from anywhere in the Hellenistic world, although it seems most likely she was either Egyptian or Greek" and that having a hypotetical Egyptian mother "might, perhaps, explain Cleopatra's reported proficiency in the Egyptian language". She concludes that due to uncertainty about Cleopatra's mother and paternal grandmother, the Queen was "somewhere between 25 per cent to 100 percent of Macedonian extraction, and that she possibly had some Egyptian genes", while highlighting that being Egyptian was matter of culture rather than phenotype, and the people of Egypt were very diverse society "with red-headed, light-skinned Egyptians living alongside curly haired, darker-skinned neighbours". Tyldesley also identifies Ptolemies as "Hellenistic Macedonians", at the same time recognizing that they "believed themselves to be a valid Egyptian dynasty" and that "Cleopatra defined herself as an Egyptian queen" whom her subjects and contemporaries accepted as such.

For the Encyclopedia Britannica's article on Queen Cleopatra, Tyldesley writes that "Cleopatra was of Macedonian descent and had little, if any, Egyptian blood", while noting that Plutarch implied she was the first Ptolemaic ruler to learn Egyptian and that for political purposes, Cleopatra styled herself as the new Isis (as well as the Greek goddess Aphrodite), like her ancestor Cleopatra III, "who had also claimed to be the living embodiment of the goddess Isis".

Roger S. Bagnall points out that the Greek attitude towards Egypt and Egyptians appears to have been an exploitative one, "in both the neutral and the negative senses of that word". Furthermore, he points out that the Greek ruling class was able to adapt to their new circumstances "without fundamental cultural alteration", which, combined with their position of power in the Egypt, "enabled them to take whatever they wished from Egypt without ceasing to become Greeks". Francine Prose notes that although Cleopatra was born and "apparently thought of herself" as a Macedonian Greek queen, all that mattered to the Romans was that "she was not a Roman and, more important, that her existence, her influence, and her power constituted an obstacle to Roman expansion".

== Arsinoe IV ==
In 2009, a BBC documentary speculated that Arsinoe IV of Egypt, the half-sister of Cleopatra VII, may have been part North African and then further speculated that Cleopatra's mother, thus Cleopatra herself, might also have been part North African. This was based largely on the claims of Hilke Thür of the Austrian Academy of Sciences, who in the 1990s had examined a headless skeleton of a female child in a 20 BCE tomb in Ephesus (modern Turkey), together with the old notes and photographs of the now-missing skull. She hypothesized the body as that of Arsinoe.

Arsinoe and Cleopatra shared the same father (Ptolemy XII Auletes) but may have had different mothers, with Thür claiming the alleged African ancestry came from the skeleton's mother. However, Clarence C. et al. demonstrated that skull measurements are not a reliable indicator of race and the measurements were jotted down in 1920 before modern forensic science took hold. To date it has never been definitively proved the skeleton is that of Arsinoe IV. When a DNA test was made that attempted to determine the identity of the child, it was impossible to get an accurate reading since the bones had been handled too many times, and the skull had been lost in Germany during World War II. Furthermore, craniometry as used by Thür to determine race is based in scientific racism that is now generally considered a discredited pseudoscience with "a long history of being put to use in racially motivated and often overtly and explicitly racist ways".

Mary Beard wrote a dissenting essay criticizing the findings, pointing out that one, there is no surviving name on the tomb and that the claim the tomb is alleged to invoke the shape of the Pharos Lighthouse "doesn't add up"; second, the skull did not survive intact and the skeleton is of a child too young to be that of Arsinoe (the bones are said to be that of a 15–18-year-old child, with Arsinoe being around her mid twenties at her death); and third, since Cleopatra and Arsinoe were not known to have the same mother, "the ethnic argument goes largely out of the window".

In 2025, a study was published that identified the body as belonging to a teenage boy, thus ultimately disproving the theory about the skeleton being remains of Arsinoe. To date, no confirmed tomb of any Ptolemaic ruler has been found. Consequently, genetic testing on Ptolemaic remains is impossible.

== See also ==
- Afrocentrism
- Ancient Egyptian race controversy
- Biological anthropology
- Demographics of Egypt
- Early life of Cleopatra
- Egyptomania
- Ptolemaic dynasty
- Ptolemaic Kingdom

== Sources ==
- 'An Almost All Greek Thing': Cleopatra VII and Hollywood Imagination, Oxford Scholarship Online, 2014, archived from the original on 2022-05-09.
- Athenaeus, Atheneus
- Ashton, Sally-Ann (Spring 2002), "Identifying the ROM's 'Cleopatra'", Rotunda: 36–39, archived from the original on 2023-03-22.
- Beard, Mary (16 March 2009), The skeleton of Cleopatra's sister? Steady on, The Times Literary Supplement, archived from the original on 17 March 2009
- Bagnall, Roger S. (1988), "Greeks and Egyptians: Ethnicity, Status, and Culture", in Bianchi, Robert S.; Fazzini, Richard A. (eds.), Cleopatra's Egypt: Age of the Ptolemies, Brooklyn Museum, ISBN 9780872731134
- Bennett, Christopher J. (1997). "Cleopatra V Tryphæna and the Genealogy of the Later Ptolemies". Ancient Society. 28: 39–66. doi:10.2143/AS.28.0.630068. ISSN 0066-1619. JSTOR 44079777. (registration required)
- Bianchi, Steven (2005). "Cleopatra VII". The Oxford Encyclopedia of Ancient Egypt. Oxford University Press.
- Bingen, Jean (2007). Hellenistic Egypt. Edinburgh University Press. (hardcover, ISBN 0-7486-1578-4; paperback, ISBN 0-7486-1579-2).
- Bradford, Ernle (2003), Cleopatra, Penguin Group, ISBN 9780141390147
- Cheshire, Wendy (2011), "The Phantom Sister of Ptolemy Alexander", Enchoria, 32: 120–130
- Draycott, Jane (2022). Cleopatra's Daughter: Egyptian Princess, Roman Prisoner, African Queen. Head of Zeus. ISBN 978-1-324-09259-9.
- Dudley, Donald (1960), The Civilization of Rome, New York: New American Library, p. 57, ISBN 978-1258450540
- Fantham, Elaine (1994). Women in the Classical World: Image and Text. Oxford University Press. ISBN 0195067274.
- Ferroukhi, Mafoud (2001a), "197 Marble portrait, perhaps of Cleopatra VII's daughter, Cleopatra Selene, Queen of Mauretania", in Walker, Susan; Higgs, Peter (eds.), Cleopatra of Egypt: from History to Myth, Princeton, NJ: Princeton University Press (British Museum Press), p. 219, ISBN 9780691088358.
- Ferroukhi, Mafoud (2001b), "262 Veiled head from a marble portrait statue", in Walker, Susan; Higgs, Peter (eds.), Cleopatra of Egypt: from History to Myth, Princeton, NJ: Princeton University Press (British Museum Press), p. 242, ISBN 9780691088358.
- Fletcher, Joann (2008), Cleopatra the Great: The Woman Behind the Legend, New York: Harper, ISBN 9780060585587.
- Goldsworthy, Adrian Keith (2010), Antony and Cleopatra, New Haven, CT: Yale University Press, ISBN 978-0300165340
- Grant, Michael (1972), Cleopatra, Edison, NJ: Barnes and Noble Books, pp. 4, 5, ISBN 978-0880297257
- Grout, James (1 April 2017), "Was Cleopatra Beautiful?", Encyclopaedia Romana, University of Chicago.
- Haley, Shelley P. (1993). "Black Feminist Thought and Classics: Re-membering, Re-claiming, Re-empowering". In Rabinowitz, Nancy Sorkin; Richlin, Amy (eds.). Feminist Theory and the Classics. Routledge. ISBN 978-1-317-85714-3. Archived from the original on 2023-04-21.
- Haley, Shelley P. (2009). "Be Not Afraid of the Dark: Critical Race Theory and Classical Studies". In Nasrallah, Laura; Fiorenza, Elisabeth Schüssler (eds.). Prejudice and Christian Beginnings: Investigating Race, Gender, and Ethnicity in Early Christian Studies. Fortress Press. ISBN 978-1-4514-1285-7. Archived from the original on 2023-04-21.
- Huß, Werner (2001). "Ägypten in hellenistischer Zeit 332–30 v. Chr. (Egypt in Hellenistic times 332–30 BC)". The Journal of Egyptian Archaeology. Munich. ISSN 0307-5133. (in German)
- Jones, Prudence J. (2006), Cleopatra: a sourcebook, Norman, Oklahoma: University of Oklahoma Press, ISBN 9780806137414, archived from the original on 2023-03-22
- Kleiner, Diana E. E. (2005), Cleopatra and Rome, Cambridge, MA: Belknap Press of Harvard University Press, ISBN 9780674019058, archived from the original on 2023-03-22
- Loren, Michael (2020). "Deadly Erinys of Latium: Cleopatra's Power in Lucan's Civil War". Brown Classics Journal. 32: 87–92.
- Lefkowitz, Mary (1992). "Ancient History, Modern Myths". The New Republic.. Reprinted with revisions as part of the essay collection Black Athena Revisited, 1996
- Lefkowitz, Mary (1997). "Not Out Of Africa: How ""Afrocentrism"" Became An Excuse To Teach Myth As". The New Republic.
- Lippert, Sandra (2013), "What's New in Demotic Studies? An Overview of the Publications 2010-2013" (PDF), The Journal of Juristic Papyrology: 33–48.
- Macurdy, Grace Harriet (1932). Hellenistic Queens: a Study of Woman-Power in Macedonia, Seleucid Syria, and Ptolemaic Egypt. Johns Hopkins University Studies in Archaeology. Vol. 14. Baltimore: Johns Hopkins Press. (Reprinted in 1985 by Ares Publishers).
- Mahaffy, JP (2001), A History of Egypt under the Ptolemaic Dynasty, Edison, NJ: Barnes and Noble Books, pp. 225, ISBN 978-0880297257
- Meadows, Andrew (2001), "Sins of the fathers; the inheritance of Cleopatra, last queen of Egypt", in Walker, Susan; Higgs, Peter (eds.), Cleopatra of Egypt: from History to Myth, Princeton, NJ: British Museum Press), pp. 14–31, ISBN 978-0714119434
- Nour, Daniel (2021), As proud Egyptians, we want a say in Cleopatra's portrayal, SBS, archived from the original on 2022-04-01.
- Pina Polo, Francisco (2013), "The Great Seducer: Cleopatra, Queen and Sex Symbol", in Knippschild, Silke; García Morcillo, Marta (eds.), Seduction and Power: Antiquity in the Visual and Performing Arts, London: Bloomsbury Academic, pp. 183–197, ISBN 9781441190659, archived from the original on 2023-03-22
- Preston, Diana (2009), Cleopatra and Antony, New York: Walker & Company, ISBN 978-0802710598
- Prose, Francine (2022). Cleopatra: Her History, Her Myth. Yale University Press. ISBN 978-0300259384.
- "Ptolemaic Dynasty Affiliates". www.tyndalehouse.com. Archived from the original on 2011-07-16. Retrieved 2017-06-09
- Roller, Duane W. (2003), The World of Juba II and Kleopatra Selene: Royal Scholarship on Rome's African Frontier, New York: Routledge, ISBN 9780415305969.
- Roller, Duane W. (2010), Cleopatra: a biography, Oxford: Oxford University Press, ISBN 9780195365535
- Roller, Duane W. (6 December 2010), Cleopatra's true racial background (and does it really matter?), Oxford University Press, archived from the original on 12 March 2019
- Samson, Julia (1990). Nefertiti & Cleopatra. Stacey International. ISBN 978-0948695186.
- Schiff, Stacy (2011), Cleopatra: A Life, UK: Random House, ISBN 978-0316001946
- Southern, Patricia (2009) [2007], Antony and Cleopatra: The Doomed Love Affair That United Ancient Rome and Egypt, Stroud, Gloucestershire: Amberley Publishing, ISBN 978-1-84868-324-2, archived from the original on 19 May 2020.
- Tyldesley, Joyce (2008), Cleopatra: Last Queen of Egypt, Basic Books, ISBN 9780465009404.
- Tyldesley, Joyce (6 December 2017), "Cleopatra, Queen of Egypt", Encyclopædia Britannica, archived from the original on 30 June 2019.
- Tyldesley, Joyce (2009). Cleopatra: Last Queen of Egypt. Profile Books Ltd (e-book ed.). ISBN 978-1-86197-901-8.
- Walker, Susan (2008), "Cleopatra in Pompeii?", Papers of the British School at Rome, 76: 35–46, 345–348, doi:10.1017/S0068246200000404, JSTOR 40311128.
- Walker, Susan; Higgs, Peter (2001), "325 Painting with a portrait of a woman in profile", in Walker, Susan; Higgs, Peter (eds.), Cleopatra of Egypt: from History to Myth, Princeton, NJ: Princeton University Press (British Museum Press), pp. 314–315, ISBN 9780691088358.
- Watterson, Barbara (2020). Cleopatra: Fact and Fiction. Amberley Publishing. ISBN 978-1-445-66965-6.
