= Shelley Haley =

American classical scholar

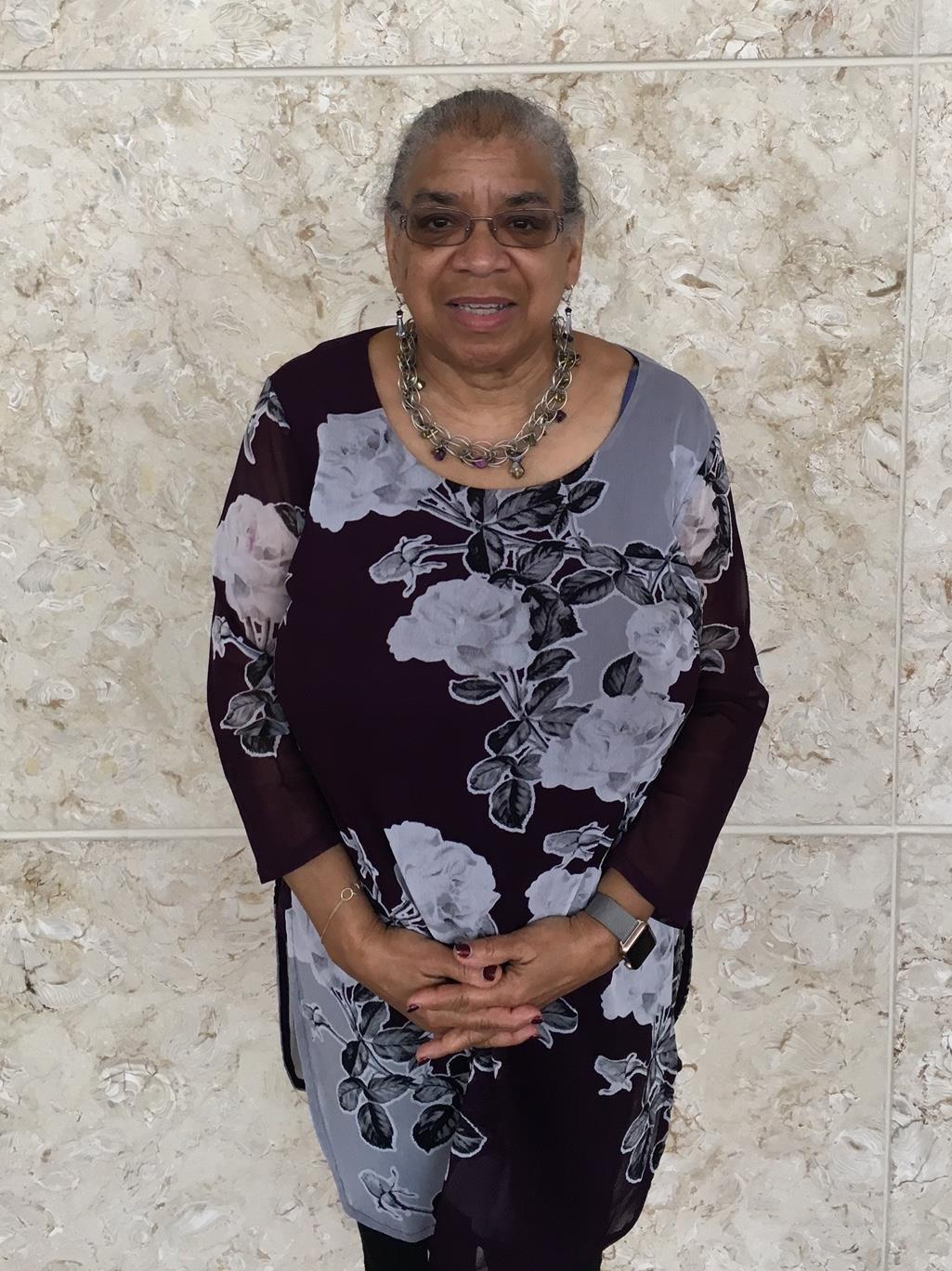
- Haley in 2019

Academic background
- Education: Syracuse University; University of Michigan
- Thesis: The Role of Amicitia in the Life of Gnaeus Pompeius Magnus

Academic work
- Discipline: Classicist
- Sub-discipline: Black feminist and critical race approaches
- Institutions: Hamilton College, New York

Shelley P. Haley is the Edward North Chair of Classics and Professor of Africana studies at Hamilton College, New York, and (in 2021) President of the Society for Classical Studies. Haley applies Black feminist and critical race approaches to the study and teaching of classics.

== Education ==
Haley graduated with a BA from Syracuse University in 1972. She was awarded a Danforth fellowship for graduate study and completed her MA (1975) and Ph.D. (1977) at the University of Michigan. Her PhD thesis was titled The Role of Amicitia in the Life of Gnaeus Pompeius Magnus.

== Career ==
After graduating, she taught at Luther College (Decorah, Iowa) from 1977 until 1978, and subsequently Howard University (Washington, D.C.) from 1979 to 1985. She was appointed to the faculty at Hamilton College in 1989.

She has also held appointments at Washington University in St. Louis ('Distinguished Visiting Scholar', 2002); and Hobart and William Smith Colleges ('Melvin Hill Visiting Scholar-in-Residence', 2013).

Haley employs Black feminist and critical race approaches to Classics, and has worked on a wide range of topics including gender in the ancient world; Latin, Greek, and comparative literature; race in classical pedagogy; and the role of African-American women (in particular Fanny Jackson Coppin) in Classics. She has described the difficulties of her early career and the process by which she became interested in race in the classical world through teaching students about Cleopatra and researching 19th-century African-American classicists.

Haley participated in the Oxford Round Table in 2003; she has served a four-year term as chief reader for the AP Latin Exam, and has chaired the AP Latin Exam Development Committee.

Haley has also appeared as an expert on Roman History and Cleopatra in the media including TLC's Rome: Power and Glory (1999), Timewatch's In Search of Cleopatra, and Netflix's African Queens season 2 episode on Cleopatra. Haley's assertion in the documentary that her grandmother told her that Cleopatra was black was criticized, though she also stated that "We don't know her exact racial heritage." Despite her claims, the ethnicity of Cleopatra has been well-studied through history and the consensus is that she was of Macedonian Greek ancestry; the debates regarding her ethnicity haven't taken place in academic circles or sources, being instead mentioned in entertainment and lifestyle magazines such as Ebony; and an article about Afrocentrism from the St. Louis Post-Dispatch in 1994 mentions the question, too, despite lacking evidence for the claim.

Haley was a founding member of The Kirkland Project for the Study of Gender, Culture, and Society; the Institute for Global African Studies (IGAS); and the Multiculturalism, Race, and Ethnicity in Classics Consortium (MRECC). In September 2019, Haley was elected President of the Society for Classical Studies for 2021, making her the Society's first African-American President.

== Distinctions and awards ==
Haley has been awarded several distinctions for her excellence in teaching and research. These include:

- Excellence in Teaching of the Classics at College Level Award, Society for Classical Studies, 2017
- The Samuel and Helen Long Prize for Excellence in Teaching, Hamilton College, 2015
- Merit Award, American Classical League, 2007
- Certificate of Recognition, The College Board, 2007
- Outstanding Woman of the Year Award in the Field of Education, YWCA of the Mohawk Valley, 1999
- The Pentagon Outstanding Service Award, Hamilton College, 1997

In 2020, The Haley Classical Journal was founded in her honor.

== Selected publications and lectures ==
Haley has published and presented widely on Cleopatra, Black Feminist Pedagogy, and the impact of a classical education on African-American women. Recent examples of her work include:

- "When I Enter: Disrupting the White, Heteronormative Narrative of Librarianship". Co-authored with Caitlin Pollock. Pushing the Margins: Women of Color and Intersectionality in LIS, eds. Rose L. Chou & Anna Pho. Sacramento: Litwin Books and Library Juice Press, 2018.
- "Re-presenting Reality: Provincial Women As Tools of Roman Social Reproduction". Women's Classical Caucus Panel, "Provincial Women in the Roman Imagination". American Philological Association, Annual Meeting, Chicago, IL., January 2–5, 2014.
- "Scientific Racism". Co-authored with Dr. Michele Paludi. Encyclopedia of Critical Psychology, York, England: Springer Reference, December 2012.
- "Be Not Afraid of the Dark: Critical Race Theory and Classical Studies". Prejudice and Christian Beginnings: Investigating Race, Gender and Ethnicity in Early Christian Studies, eds. Laura Nasrallah and Elisabeth Schüssler Fiorenza, 4 Minneapolis, Minn.: Fortress Press, 2009: 27–50.
- "Lucian's 'Leaena and Clonarium': Voyeurism or a Challenge to Assumptions?". Among Women: From the Homosocial to the Homoerotic in the Ancient World, eds. Nancy S. Rabinowitz and Lisa Auanger, Austin, Texas: The University of Texas Press, 2002: 286–303.
- "Fanny Jackson Coppin's Reminiscences of a School Life and Hints on Teaching". African American Women Writers Series, 1910–1940, Volume 8, ed. Henry Louis Gates, Jr., New York: G. K. Hall/Macmillan 1995.
- "Self-definition, community and resistance: Euripides' Medea and Toni Morrison's Beloved". Thamyris: mythmaking from past to present, Vol. 2, No. 2 (1995): 177–206.
- "Black Feminist Thought and Classics: Re-membering, Re-claiming, Re-empowering". Feminist Theory and the Classics, eds. by Nancy Sorkin Rabinowitz & Amy Richlin, New York & Oxford: Routledge, 1993.
- "Livy, passion, and cultural stereotypes". Historia: Zeitschrift fur Alte Geschichte (1990): 375–381.
- "The Five Wives of Pompey the Great". Greece and Rome 32, no. 1 (1985): 49–59.
- "Archias, Theophanes, and Cicero: The Politics of the Pro Archia". The Classical Bulletin 59, 1983: 1–4.
