= Antirhodos =

Former island in the eastern harbor of Alexandria, Egypt

- Map of ancient Alexandria. "2" marks the island of Antirhodos.

- Map of Egypt showing the location of Antirhodos.
- 31°12′24″N 29°54′01″E
- Type: Island
- Cultures: Ptolemaic Kingdom
- Associated with: Cleopatra
- Location: Alexandria
- Region: Egypt
- Part of: Alexandria Port

History
- Built: c. 250BC

Site notes
- Elevation: −5 m (−16 ft)
- Length: 300 metres (980 ft)
- Area: 500 ha (1,200 acres)
- Excavation dates: 1996
- Archaeologists: Franck Goddio
- Condition: Submerged

Antirhodos (sometimes Antirrhodos or Anti Rhodes) was an island in the eastern harbor of Alexandria, Egypt, on which a Ptolemaic Egyptian palace was sited. The island was occupied until the reigns of Roman emperors Septimius Severus and Caracalla. It likely sank in the 4th century, when it succumbed to earthquakes and a tsunami following an earthquake in the eastern Mediterranean near Crete in the year 365. The site now lies underwater, near the seafront of modern Alexandria, at a depth of approximately five metres (16 ft).

Several descriptions of the island were recorded in classical antiquity by Greek geographers and historians. Strabo described a royal house on Antirhodos in 27 BC, and wrote that the island's name ("counter-Rhodes") derived from the island's rivalry with the island of Rhodes. Antirhodos was part of Alexandria's ancient royal port called the Portus Magnus, which also included parts of the Lochias peninsula in the East and the island of Pharos in the West. The Portus Magnus was abandoned and left as an open bay after an earthquake in the 8th century.

== Rediscovery ==
In 1996, underwater archaeology in the harbour of Alexandria conducted by Franck Goddio located the island and found that it was on the opposite side of the harbour from where it was placed by Strabo. The excavations showed that the island had been occupied from before the founding of Alexandria and that it was totally levelled and prepared for construction around 250BC.

The island was small (about 500 hectares or 1,200 acres) and fully paved, with three branches leading in different directions. The main branch was 300 metres (1,000 ft) long and had an esplanade facing the site of the Caesarium temple on the mainland seafront.

On the esplanade Goddio uncovered the remains of a relatively modest (90 metres by 30 metres) marble-floored 3rd century BC palace, believed to have been Cleopatra's royal quarters. On another narrow branch of the island there was a small Temple of Isis which had at its entrance a life-size granite statue representing a shaven-headed Egyptian priest of the goddess Isis carrying a jar topped with an image of Osiris. A pair of granite sphinxes flanked the statue, one of which had the head of Cleopatra's father.

Between the branches on the eastern side of the island there was a small port with docks. Here there was a series of 60 columns, each 1 metre in diameter and 7 metres in length, made of red Egyptian granite and topped with a decorated crown. Ancient paintings indicate that the columns acted as the ceremonial gateway to the island. The wreck of a 30-metre long 1st century BC or 1st century AD Roman ship has been identified in the vicinity of the port. Evidence from a hole in the ship's hull suggests that it could have sunk after being rammed by another boat.

In 2025, Goddio and his team of the IEASM announced the discovery of well-preserved timbers of a shipwreck that was one of Egypt’s famous ancient pleasure barges (thalamagos) in the Port of the Royal Island of Antirhodos.

The site of Mark Antony's uncompleted palace, the Timonium, has also been located opposite Antirhodos as well as the temple to Poseidon on the Poseidium Peninsula. Other finds include a colossal stone head thought to be of Cleopatra's son Caesarion, and a huge quartzite block with an engraving of a pharaoh and an inscription indicating that it depicts Seti I, father of Ramses II. Some of the pharaonic objects on the site had been brought from Heliopolis by the Ptolemaic rulers and re-used to construct their buildings. The remains on the island do not seem to date from later than the Ptolemaic period, suggesting the palace may have been abandoned soon after Cleopatra's death and the absorption of Egypt into the Roman Republic.

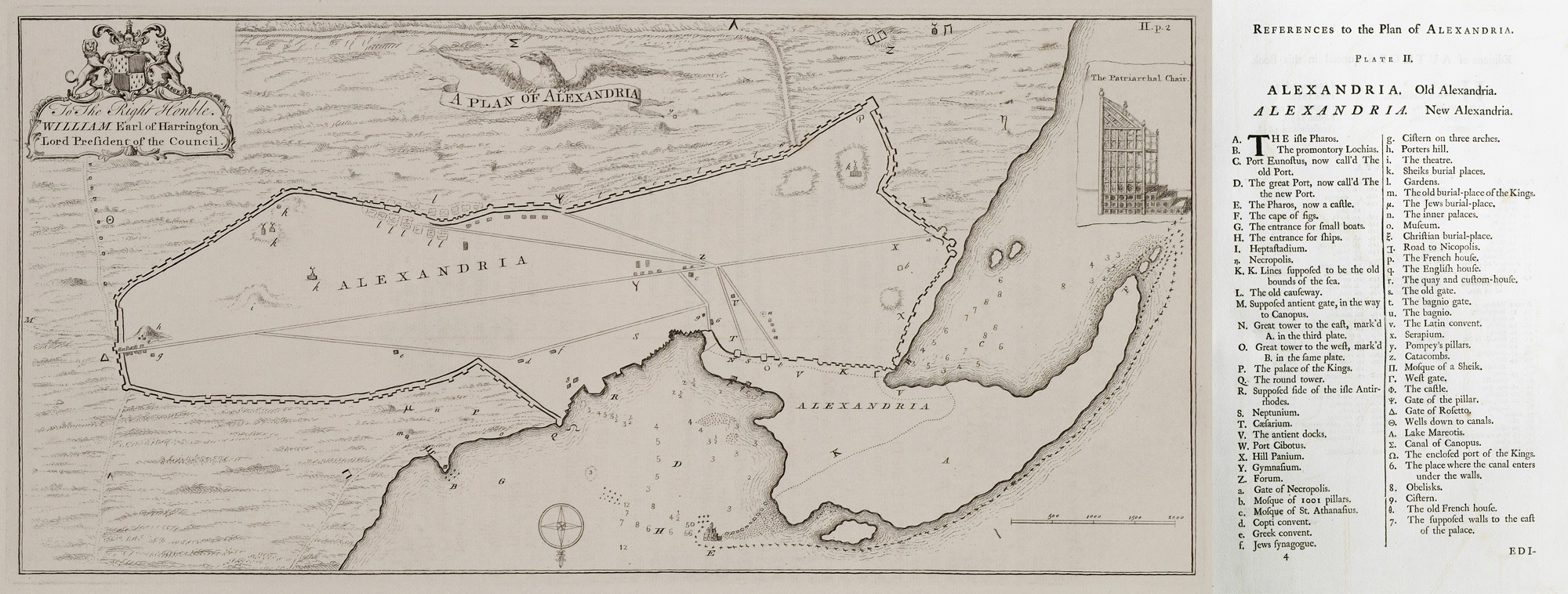
1743 map of Alexandria showing "R. Supposed site of the isle Antirrhodes"

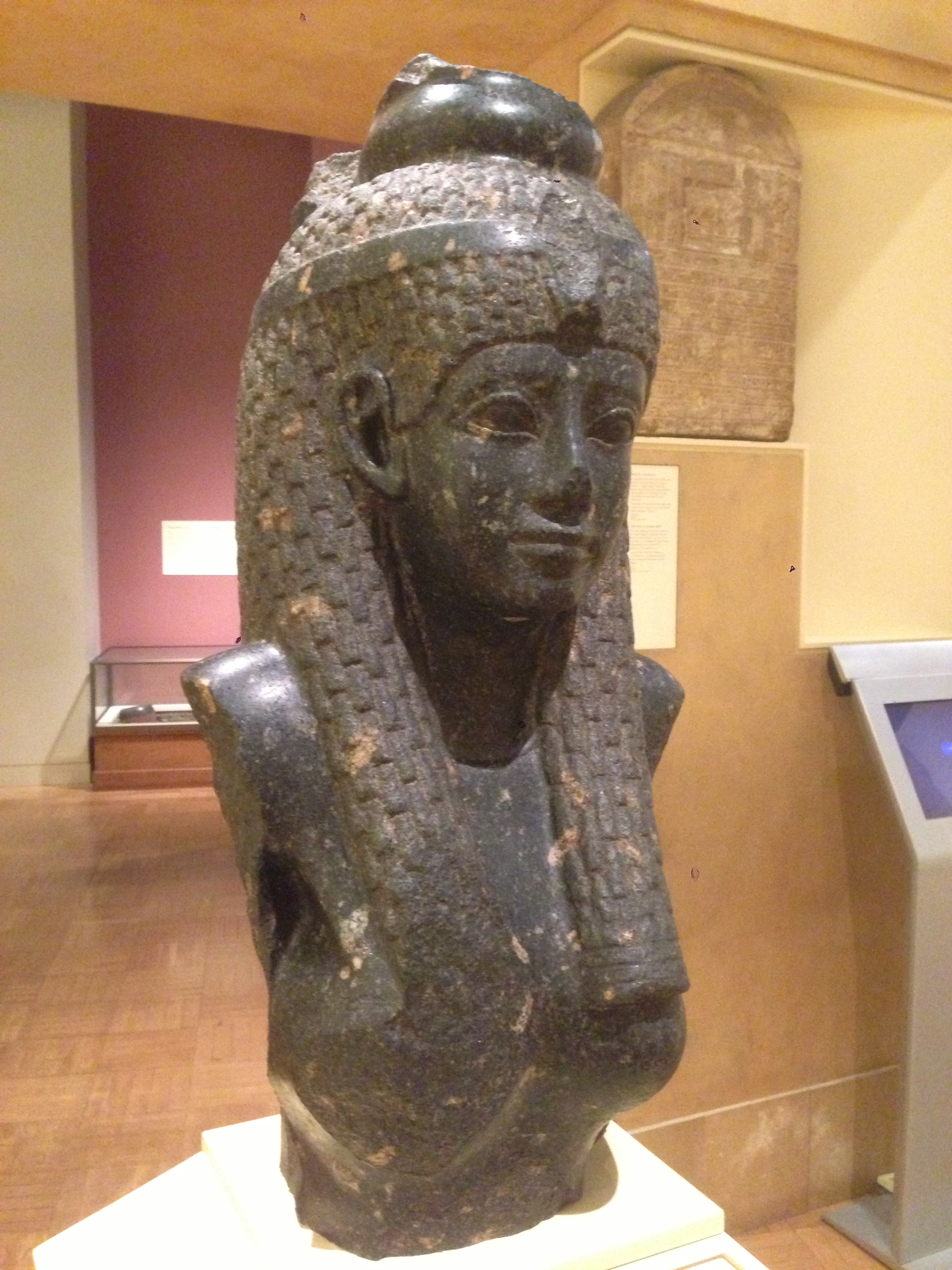
Bust of Cleopatra currently on display at the Royal Ontario Museum, Toronto. The bust is believed to have been discovered at the royal palace on Antirhodos.

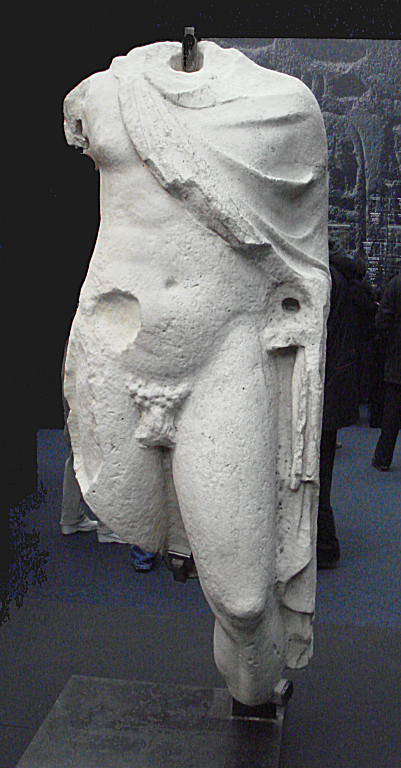
White marble torso of Hermes discovered on the southern branch of the Island of Antirhodos. (Grand Palais exhibition, 2006)
