= Klaus Zimmermann =

German ancient historian (born 1964)

Klaus Zimmermann (born 8 February 1964 in Würzburg) is a German ancient historian.

Klaus Zimmermann, son of Medievalist Gerd Zimmermann, completed his abitur at E.T.A. Hoffmann-Gymnasium Bamberg in 1983. After his military service, Zimmermann began his studies at the University of Bamberg in 1985/6. He achieved his master's in 1993. From 1994 until 1998 he was scholarly assistant at the Commission for Ancient History and Epigraphy in the German Archaeological Institute in Munich. In 1998 he received his doctorate from Werner Huß for his dissertation Libyen. Das Land südlich des Mittelmeers im Weltbild der Griechen (Libya: The Land South of the Mediterranean in the Worldview of the Greeks). From 1998 until 2006 he was wissenschaftlicher Assistent at the University of Jena. In 2005 he achieved his Habilitation at Jena in the subject of ancient history. From 2006 to 2007 Zimmerman was Senior Assistent at Jena and from 2007 to 2009 he was an Academic Advisor. On 1 October 2009 he succeeded Elmar Schwertheim in the research position for Asia Minor in the seminar for ancient history at University of Münster.

His research focusses are religion in politics / politics in religion, the appropriation of social memory by the church as an institution and the day-to-day experience of death and dying in the Imperial period and Late Antiquity.

== Selected works ==
- Karthago. Aufstieg und Fall einer Großmacht. (Carthage: Rise and Fall of a Great Power)/ Wissenschaftliche Buchgesellschaft, Darmstadt 2010, ISBN 978-3-534-22790-7.
- Rom und Karthago. (Rome and Carthage) Wissenschaftliche Buchgesellschaft, Darmstadt 2005, ISBN 3-534-15496-7, 3rd revised, bibliographically updated edition 2013, ISBN 978-3-534-26025-6.
- Libyen. Das Land südlich des Mittelmeers im Weltbild der Griechen (Libya: The Land South of the Mediterranean in the Worldview of the Greeks = Vestigia. Vol. 51). Beck, München 1999, ISBN 3-406-44556-X (Zugleich: Bamberg, Universität, Dissertation, 1997/98).
