= Werner Huß =

German ancient historian (born 1936)

- Born: 8 September 1936; Schwabmünchen, Germany
- Died: 21 April 2023; Munich, Germany
- Occupation: ancient historian
- Known for: Carthaginian and Hellenistic history

Werner Huß (8 September 1936 – 21 April 2023) was a German ancient historian.

== Life ==
Werner Huß received a doctorate in Roman Catholic theology in 1967 and his habilitation in ancient history in 1975 at Munich with the work Untersuchungen zur Außenpolitik Ptolemaios' IV. (Research into the Foreign Policy of Ptolemy IV). He taught as Professor Ordinarius of Ancient History at the University of Bamberg from 1978 until his retirement in 2001. He was co-editor of the Münchener Beiträge zur Papyrusforschung und antiken Rechtsgeschichte (Munich Contributions to Papyrology and Ancient Legal History).

Huß's main research areas were Carthaginian history, Hellenistic history (especially Ptolemaic Egypt) and ancient religious history. His most important works are the Geschichte der Karthager (History of the Carthaginians) and Ägypten in hellenistischer Zeit 332-30 v. Chr. (Egypt in Hellenistic Times 332–30 BC).

Werner Huß was the father of Medieval Latinist historian Bernhard Huß.

== Selected works ==
- Untersuchungen zur Außenpolitik Ptolemaios' IV (Research into the Foreign Policy of Ptolemy IV = Münchener Beiträge zur Papyrusforschung und antiken Rechtsgeschichte. Volume 69). Beck, Munich 1976, ISBN 3-406-00669-8.
- With Karl Strobel: Beiträge zur Geschichte (Contributions to History = Bamberger Hochschulschriften. Volume 9). Bayerische Verlagsanstalt, Bamberg 1983, ISBN 3-87052-657-2.
- Geschichte der Karthager (History of the Carthaginians = Handbuch der Altertumswissenschaft. Section 3, Part 8). Beck, München 1985, ISBN 3-406-30654-3.
  - also in Spanish (Los Cartagineses 1993) and Italian (Cartagine 1995) translation and in the series Beck'sche Sonderausgaben as: Die Karthager. Beck, München 1990, ISBN 3-406-34385-6.
- Karthago (Carthage = Wege der Forschung. Volume 654). Wissenschaftliche Buchgesellschaft, Darmstadt 1992, ISBN 3-534-04236-0.
- Der makedonische König und die ägyptischen Priester (The Macedonian King and the Egyptian Priests = Historia Einzelschriften. Volume 85). Steiner, Stuttgart 1994, ISBN 3-515-06502-4.
- Ägypten in hellenistischer Zeit 332–30 v. Chr. (Egypt in Hellenistic Times 332–30 BC) Beck, München 2001, ISBN 3-406-47154-4 (Review by Friederike Herklotz).
- Die Verwaltung des ptolemaiischen Reichs (The Administration of the Ptolemaic Empire = Münchener Beiträge zur Papyrusforschung und antiken Rechtsgeschichte. Volume 104). Beck, München 2011, ISBN 978-3-406-62915-0.
- Die Wirtschaft Ägyptens in hellenistischer Zeit (The Economy of Egypt in Hellenistic Times = Münchener Beiträge zur Papyrusforschung und antiken Rechtsgeschichte. Volume 105). Beck, München 2012, ISBN 978-3-406-64088-9.

== Bibliography ==
- Klaus Geus, Klaus Zimmermann (Edd.): Punica-Libyca-Ptolemaica. Festschrift für Werner Huss zum 65. Geburtstag dargebracht von Schülern, Freunden, und Kollegen. Orientalia Lovaniensia Analecta (OLA 104). Leuven, et al.: Peeters Publishers, 2001. ISBN 90-429-1066-6
