= Rebecca Futo Kennedy =

American academic and classicist

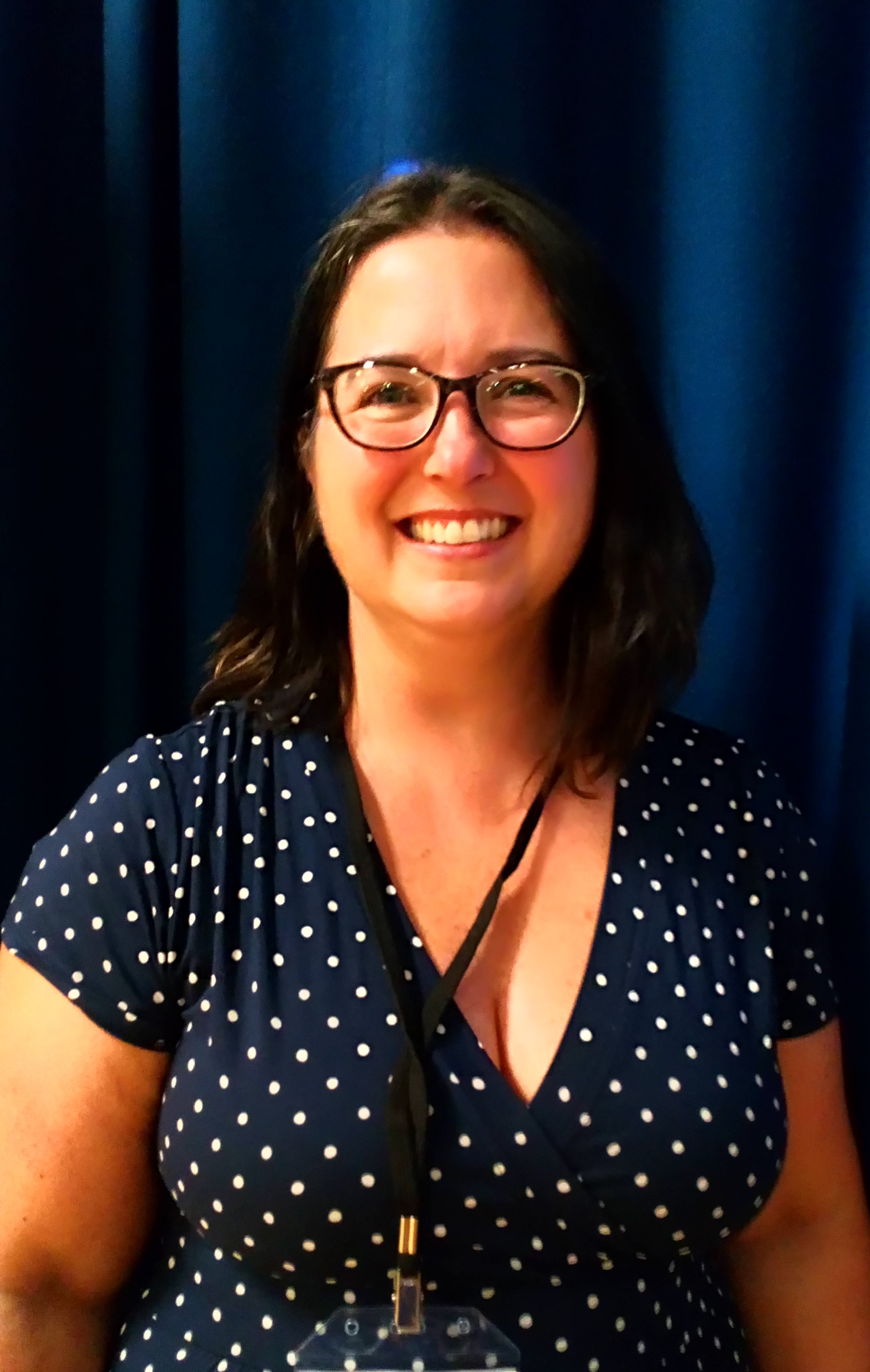
- Rebecca Futo Kennedy at the FIEC/Classical Association Conference, July 2019

Academic background
- Education: Ohio State University
- Thesis: Athena/Athens on Stage: Athena in the Tragedies of Aeschylus and Sophocles (2003)

Academic work
- Discipline: Classics; Women's and Gender Studies; Environmental studies
- Institutions: Denison University; Denison Museum; Union College; George Washington University; Howard University

Rebecca Futo Kennedy is Associate Professor of Classics, Women's and Gender Studies, and Environmental Studies at Denison University, and the Director of the Denison Museum. Her research focuses on the political, social, and cultural history of Classical Athens, Athenian tragedy, ancient immigration, ancient theories of race and ethnicity, and the reception of those theories in modern race science.

== Career ==
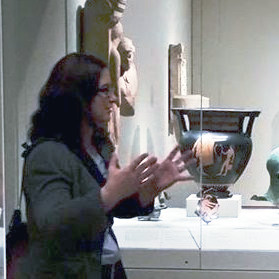
Rebecca Futo Kennedy at the Cleveland Museum of Art

Kennedy completed her BA in Classical Studies at the University of California, San Diego in 1997 and PhD at the Ohio State University in 2003, with a thesis entitled Athena/Athens on Stage: Athena in the Tragedies of Aeschylus and Sophocles.

Since 2009, she has taught at Denison University, first as an Assistant Professor (2009-2015) and now as an Associate Professor (2015–present). Previously she held appointments at Union College (2008-9), George Washington University (2005-8), and Howard University (2003-5). In 2019, Kennedy was teaching a wide range of courses on the ancient world, including both Greek and Latin language, Greek and Roman history and politics, ancient drama, and ancient identities.

In 2016, Kennedy became the Director of the Denison Museum, a teaching museum which enhances the university's curriculum using cultural heritage materials and artworks.

== Research publications ==
Kennedy is the author of two monographs. The first is 'Athena's Justice: Athena, Athens, and the Concept of Justice in Greek Tragedy'. The second is 'Immigrant Women in Athens: Gender, Ethnicity, and Citizenship in the Classical City'.

Her current project, commissioned and under contract with Johns Hopkins University Press, is a book on race in classical antiquity and its contemporary legacy.

Kennedy is the editor or co-editor of the following volumes, handbooks, and translations:

- 'Race and Ethnicity in the Classical World: An Anthology of Primary Sources' (Hackett, 2013), co-edited with C.S. Roy and M.L. Goldman.
- 'The Routledge Handbook to Identity and the Environment in the Classical and Medieval Worlds' (Routledge, 2016), co-edited with Molly Jones-Lewis.
- 'Brill's Companion to the Reception of Aeschylus' (Brill, 2017).
- 'Ancient Greek and Roman Women: An Anthology of Primary Sources' (Hackett, in progress), co-editor, co-author, and translator with M.L. Goldman.

Kennedy's research has been cited in The New Yorker, in an article on 'The Myth of Classical Whiteness', by Margaret Talbot.

== Public engagement and media ==
Alongside her research and teaching, Kennedy also writes and publishes widely in non-traditional formats, including her personal blog entitled 'Classics at the Intersections'. This blog is described by Kennedy herself as 'random thoughts of a Classicist on ancient Greek and Roman culture and contemporary America'.

Other publications and media appearances of this kind included:

- “We Condone it by Our Silence: Confronting Classics’ Complicity in White Supremacy”, Eidolon, 2017.
- “Why I Teach About Race and Ethnicity in the Classical World”, Eidolon, 2017.
- “Addressing Harassment in Academia at the SCS in Boston”, Society for Classical Studies Blog, 2018.
- "A Day in the Life of a Classicist and Museum Director", Society for Classical Studies Blog, 2018.
- Special Guest Episode on 'The History of Ancient Greece' podcast, discussing Race and Ethnicity in antiquity, 2018.
- Interviewed for episodes of 'The Endless Knot' podcast (hosted by Mark Sundaram and Aven McMaster) on "Race and Racism in Ancient and Medieval Studies, Part 1: The Problem" and "Part 2: The Response", 2018.
- Interviewed for "Classics Confidential Shorts!" with Elton Barker of the Open University, discussing work in progress on race and ethnicity and classics, 2019.
- Interview with Itinera Podcast on how I became a classicist, being a first gen in academia, and issues of race/ethnicity in the ancient world.
- "The Study of Classics in Changing" with Max L. Goldman, Inside Higher Ed, 2021.
- "Classics is a part of Black intellectual history - Howard needs to keep it" with Jackie Murray, The Undefeated, 2021.
- "Were the Ancient Macedonians Greeks?", interview to the Youtube channel: Study of Antiquity and the Middle Ages.

Kennedy was also a 'talking head' contributor to the History Channel's series Clash of the Gods (2009), in the episodes "Minotaur", "Hercules", and "Medusa".
