= Bust of Cleopatra =

Ancient Egyptian sculpture in Toronto

Statue fragment of Cleopatra VII
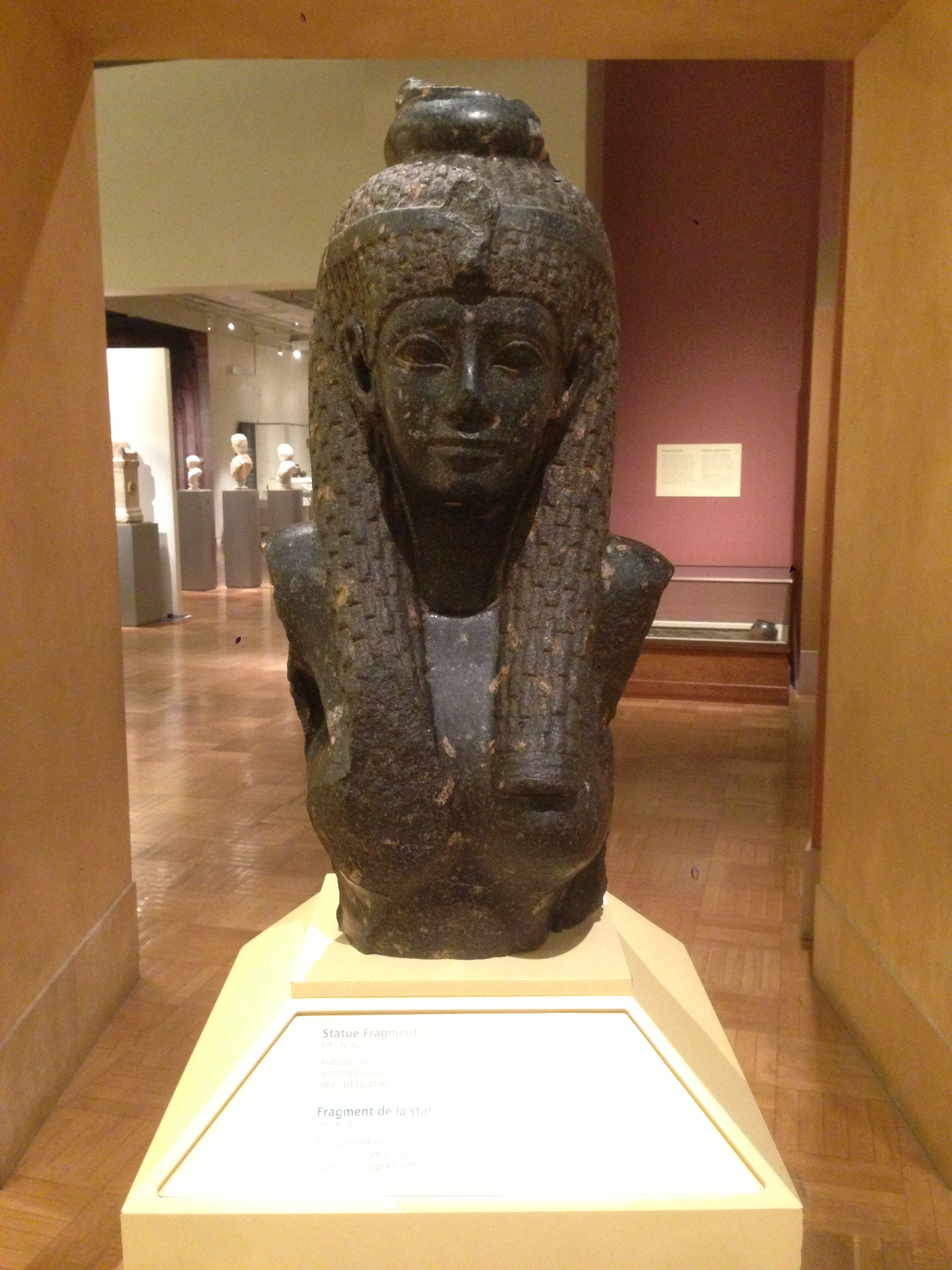
- Dimensions: 63.5 cm × 33.3 cm (25.0 in × 13.1 in)
- Location: Royal Ontario Museum, Toronto

The Bust of Cleopatra VII is a granite bust currently on display in the Gallery of Ancient Egypt at the Royal Ontario Museum (ROM). It is believed to have been discovered in Alexandria, Egypt at the site of Cleopatra's sunken palace on the island of Antirhodos. The bust was purchased by the ROM's founder Charles Trick Currelly while on expedition in Egypt in the early 20th Century.

The Bust of Cleopatra VII can be found on Level 3 of the ROM in the Galleries of Africa: Egypt along with almost 2000 other Egyptian artifacts on display.

== Identification history ==
=== 1960s ===
The Egyptologist Bernard Von Bothmer of the Brooklyn Museum was the first expert to attempt to identify the piece and published his findings in an exhibition catalogue from 1960. On the subject of identification of such statues, Von Bothmer said "each sculpture has to be judged by style, rather than by attributes and accoutrements."

- Neckline: Von Bothmer noted that "with exceptions, the thin garment indicated by the neckline is more common in early than in late Ptolemaic Sculpture."

- Facial Features: When examining the features of the sculpted face, Von Bothmer was of the opinion "the expression is dry, bland, and non-committal." He felt as though "there is a mystery in the face, and the puzzling element is probably Hellenistic." Based on closer analysis, he thought that the piece ought to be "distinguished from more traditional sculptures of the early Ptolemaic Period."

With no other previous scholarly literature available on the sculpture at the time, Von Bothmer concluded that: "If the date suggested (about 240-200 BC) is correct, we may have in this queen either Berenice II or Arsinoe III."

The statue's round facial and neckline features

=== 1980s ===
Robert S. Bianchi, also of the Brooklyn Museum, suggested the bust was either of a Queen or Goddess because "the appearance of the uraeus on the hair band is an attribute common to both." Bianchi thought a more precise identification would have been possible "had the annulets on the crown of the head been preserved."

- Neckline: Bianchi decided to focus on other sculpted features of the bust "for the chronological criteria." He made note of the "concave, raised neckline" on the statue and compared the features of the neckline with other Ptolemaic statues of women from the Musées royaux d'art et d'histoire in Brussels, Belgium (English: Royal Museums of Art and History) and the Yale University Art Gallery in New Haven, Connecticut. The statues Bianchi used to compare with the ROM's piece were both dated between 200-100 BC.

- Facial Features: Bianchi also identified the bust's time period using the sculpting style of the facial features. He noted "The face is modeled in broad planes without the addition of linear adjuncts, and the treatment of the eyes, with a creased upper lid which passes over the lower, recalls features common to sculptures assigned to 3rd and 2nd centuries BC."

With this research, evidence began to suggest that the statue belonging to the ROM had different characteristics when compared with other Ptolemaic statues from the 240-200 BC period. Bianchi's research challenged the first commonly accepted identification of the statue by dating the fragment to between 200 and 100 BC, and by giving merit to the possibility that the statue in fact depicts a goddess

=== 2000s - present ===
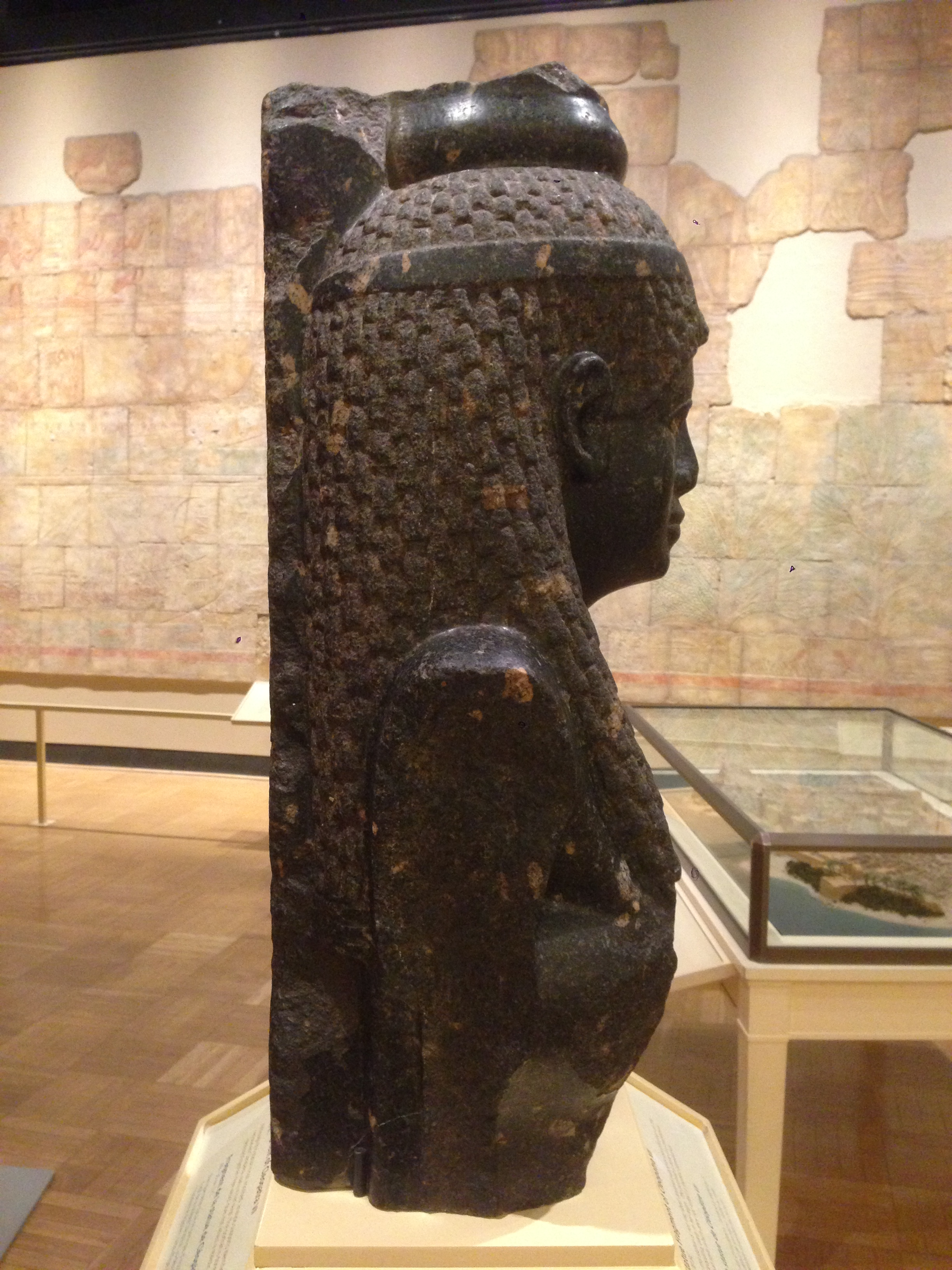
A large back pillar protrudes from the back of the sculpture and base of the crown on the top of the head

Sally-Ann Ashton of The Fitzwilliam Museum focuses on "the unusual extended back pillar with crown and the rounded portrait features, which on closer examination echo but do not exactly match those of early Ptolemaic period" in dating the statue.

- Facial Features: While examining the statue's face, Ashton noted "in profile, the face appears flat and almost angular, a feature typical of Roman-era copies of Ptolemaic sculpture." She adds, "the pronounced modelling around the eyes is typical of Roman-period sculptures and can be found on numerous sphinxes and portraits of the emperor as pharaoh."

The Roman copying of Ptolemaic sculpting traditions may be due in-part to a policy introduced by Cleopatra VII. As Ashton writes "research undertaken for the British Museum's Cleopatra of Egypt exhibition, scholars had discovered Cleopatra VII had a policy of associating herself with Arsinoe II." This policy "included copying the sculptures of Arsinoe's day (early Ptolemaic period) who remained a popular goddess into the Roman period."

In reference to the past attempts at identification based on facial features Ashton remarked, "it is not surprising then that some earlier-style features found their way into the Roman-Egyptian repertoire of Cleopatra's time, which also explains why scholars have struggled to place the ROM's piece."

- Back Pillar and Crown: Ashton made a connection between the statue at the ROM and an almost identical piece from the Petrie Museum of Egyptian Archaeology, University College, London, "which shares the unusual pillar and crown, is also linked to the 1st century BC and to Cleopatra herself."

The back pillar usually "extended beyond the statue's head only in colossal statue's to support the headdress." The ROM and the Petrie sculptures were "smaller than life-size" yet both shared the back pillars defining characteristic. While the piece at the ROM does not have any identifying inscriptions, the sculpture at the Petrie Museum does and reads "king's sister and king's wife." The inscription on the Petrie sculpture identifies the piece to be of Cleopatra VII sometime between 46-47 BC.

The crown of the statue (now broken) provided another link to identifying the statue. "In form, the ROM and the Petrie sculptures are the same; both have the crown carved from the same block of stone as the statue's." The differences in the two crowns can be found on the statue's headdress. The ROM's statue has one uraeus (cobra) sculpted into the headdress, while the Petrie piece has three. One cobra was usually indicative of being "associated with Arsinoe II" a queen we now know Cleopatra VII was synonymous with, through policy. Three cobras was the usual distinction Cleopatra VII would use in motifs. With this in mind, Ashton hypothesized that "the ROM statue may thus be a missing link-a very early representation of the queen, at a time before she had adopted the three cobras, perhaps during her early reign with Ptolemy XIII. This would date the statue from 51 to 47 BC.

Currently, the artifact label for the Royal Ontario Museum's statue of Cleopatra VII reads as follows:

Statue Fragment of Cleopatra VII
69 - 30 BC
Although this statue is not inscribed, analysis supports identification as the renowned Cleopatra, early in her reign. The portrait is done in a traditional, idealized Egyptian style which does not reflect a realistic appearance.

== Cultural analysis ==
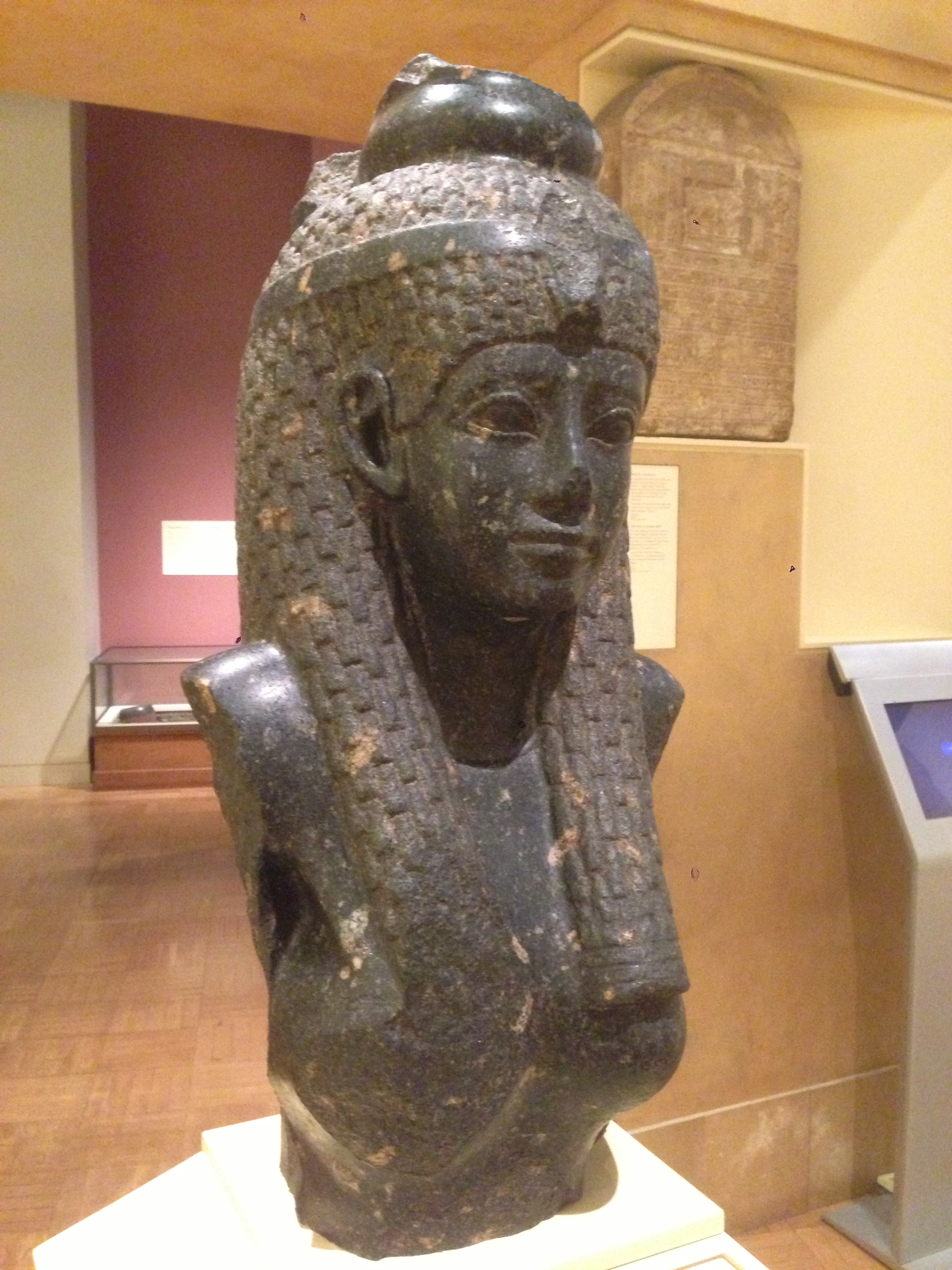

=== Ancient Egyptian ===
Roberta Shaw, Assistant Curator of World Cultures at the Royal Ontario Museum suggest, "the statue probably stood outside some important municipal building. Perhaps a temple, perhaps the famous Alexandrian Library." The object's meaning within Ancient Egyptian culture stems from its role as a municipal statue. The small-sized nature demonstrates the statue would have been seen on a daily basis for the late Ptolemaic Egyptians; it would have been displayed at a level where the public could easily identify it as Cleopatra VII.

In contrast, the Roman busts of Cleopatra that have survived, including the Berlin Cleopatra in the Altes Museum and the Vatican Cleopatra in the Vatican Museums (excluding the now disputed British Museum bust of Cleopatra thought to be a Roman woman imitating her hairstyle), depict the queen as a Hellenistic Greek monarch with a royal diadem and "melon" hairstyle of her Ptolemaic Greek ancestors Arsinoe II and Berenice II. A Hellenistic bust in the Archaeological Museum of Cherchel, Algeria again shows Cleopatra wearing the royal diadem, symbol of Greek kingship, but with a different hairstyle than the Berlin and Vatican busts. Another Parian-marble Roman bust of Cleopatra exists in the Capitoline Museums of Rome, but it features her wearing an Egyptian-style vulture headdress instead of a diadem.

=== Modern day ===
The modern day significance of the statue can be found in its rarity and its academic properties. In regards to rarity, Roberta Shaw states that "the ROM's statue of Cleopatra VII forms part of a pair," and is believed that "the sister statue resides in Alexandria." This pair is one of a kind, as no other unique pair of related statues of this iconic ancient queen during the period 69 - 30 BC have been discovered (although other sculptures of her exist). For this reason, the ROM's statue gives all the opportunity to examine Ptolemaic/Roman egyptianizing style of sculpture, establish a timeline to other period sculpture, and as Ashton states it "likely shows us the earliest representations of Cleopatra in two roles: queen and goddess of Egypt."

== See also ==
- Cleopatra VII
- Ptolemaic Dynasty
- Ptolemaic Kingdom
- Ancient Egypt
- Arsinoe II
