= Nancy Sorkin Rabinowitz =

American classical scholar

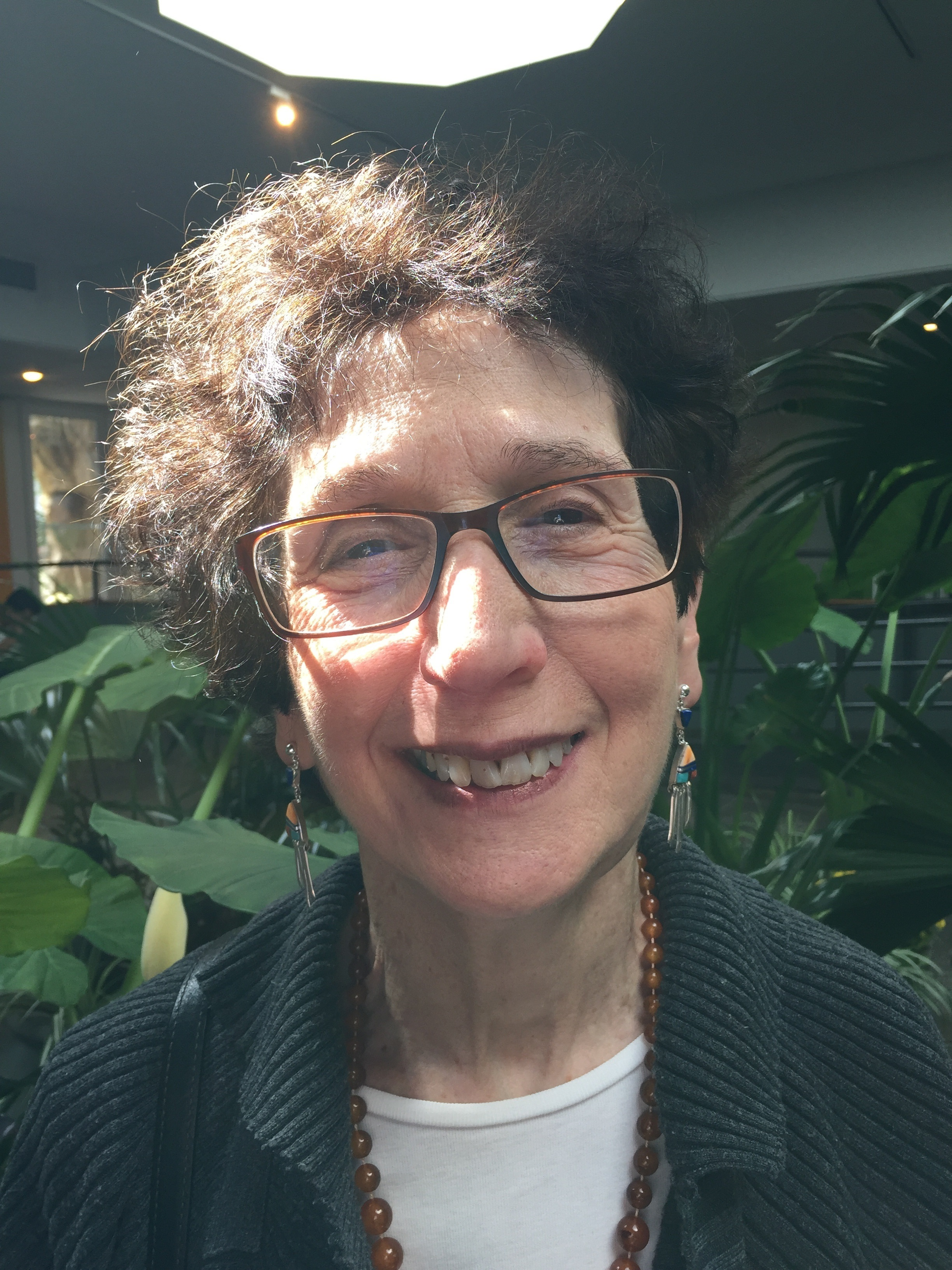
- Nancy Sorkin Rabinowitz
- Born: Manhattan, New York City
- Occupation: Retired
- Known for: Contributing to the writing of many books on Greek mythology and feminism.

Academic background
- Education: University of Chicago

Academic work
- Discipline: Classics
- Sub-discipline: Greek literature
- Institutions: Hamilton College

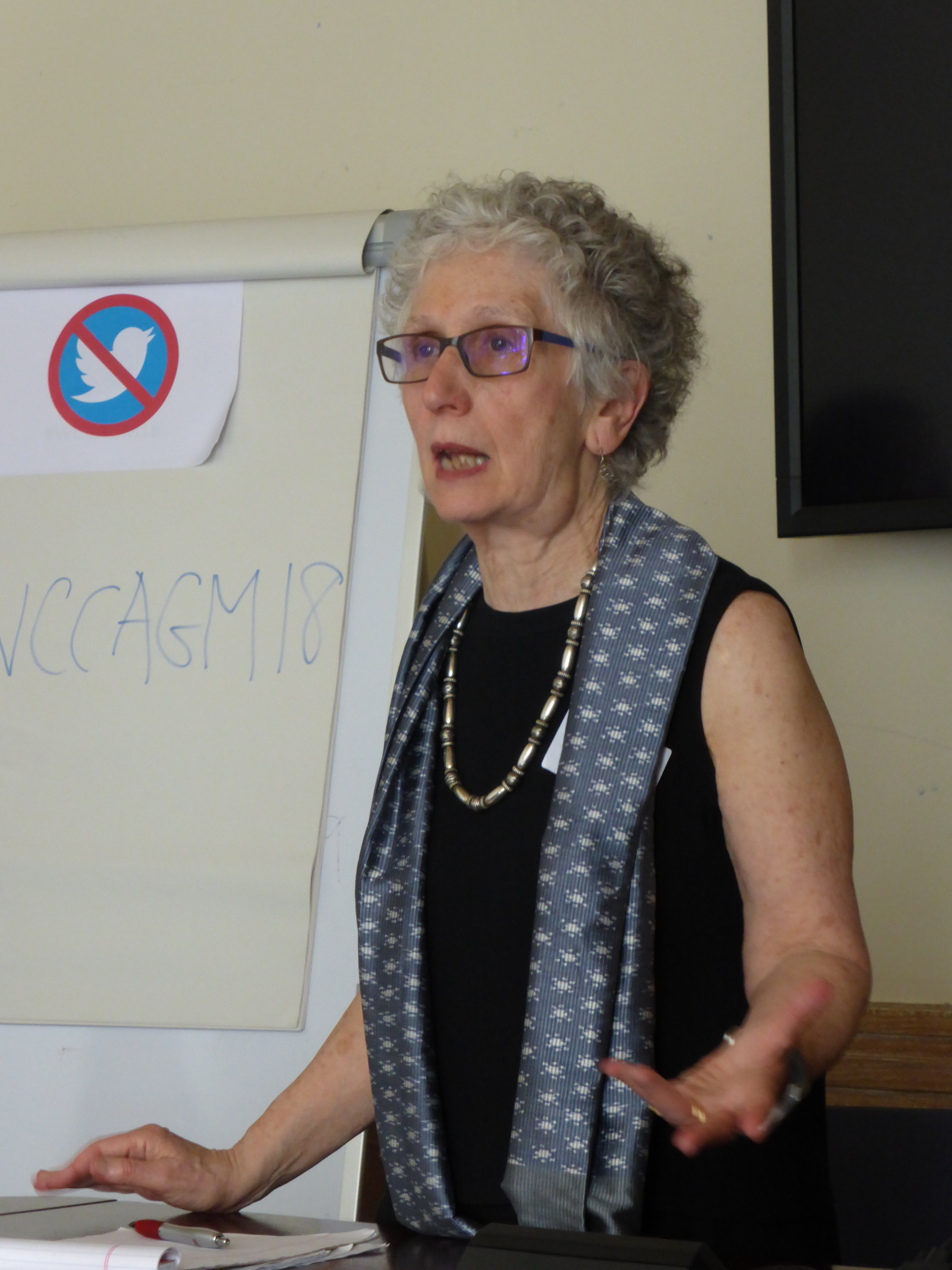
Nancy Sorkin Rabinowitz giving a keynote lecture at the Women's Classical Committee Annual General Meeting, 2018, held at the Institute of Classical Studies, University of London

Nancy Sorkin Rabinowitz is a classical scholar, specialising in ancient Greek literature and intersectional feminism.

== Career ==
Sorkin Rabinowitz graduated from City College of New York and received her Ph.D. from University of Chicago for the thesis 'From force to persuasion: dragon battle imagery in Aeschylus' Oresteia' (1976). Rabinowitz joined the faculty of Hamilton College in 1974, where she is Margaret Bundy Scott Professor of Comparative Literature. She is an expert on ancient Greek tragedy, feminist theory, and modern literature.

Sorkin Rabinowitz is a member of the Society for Classical Studies, the Women's Classical Caucus, and of the Lambda Classical Caucus (formerly the Lesbian, Gay and Bisexual Caucus of APA). She contributed to the establishment of the SCS Affiliated Group Classics and Social Justice, in which she is responsible for the Prisons action committee. From 1995 to 2005, she was Director of the Kirkland Project for the Study of Gender, Society, and Culture, at Hamilton College. In 1993, she co-edited together with Amy Richlin one of the first volumes that discussed the importance of opening the field of Classics to the use of Feminist Theory.

Having previously collaborated with the Medea Project: Theatre for Incarcerated Women/HIV Circle, which uses arts and education as a form of social activism, she currently contributes to the Hamilton Oneida Prison Education (HOPE) project at Hamilton College, aimed at bringing classical texts and theatre beyond classroom teaching or elitist culture. Her edited collection, From Abortion to Pederasty: Addressing Difficult Topics in the Classics Classroom, coedited with Fiona McHardy, won the inaugural Teaching Literature Book Award in 2015.

== Selected bibliography ==
- Anxiety Veiled: Euripides and the Traffic in Women. Ithaca, NY: Cornell, 1993. ISBN 0801428459 (hbk.), ISBN 0801480914 (pbk.).
- Women on the Edge: Four Plays by Euripides. Translator and editor, Euripides' Alcestis. New York: Routledge, 1999. ISBN 0415907748.
- Greek Tragedy. Oxford: Wiley-Blackwell, 2008. ISBN 1405121602 (hbk.).

Edited volumes

- Feminist Theory and the Classics (co-editor with Amy Richlin). New York; London: Routledge, 1993. ISBN 0415906458(hbk.), ISBN 0415906466 (pbk.).
- Among Women: From the Homosocial to the Homoerotic in the Ancient World (co-editor with Lisa Auanger). Austin: University of Texas Press, 2002. Paperback edition, 2009. ISBN 0292771134.
- Vision and Viewing in Ancient Greece (co-editor with Sue Blundell and Douglas Cairns). Special issue of Helios 40.1 and 2 (2013).
- From Abortion to Pederasty: Addressing Difficult Topics in the Classics Classroom (co-editor with Fiona McHardy). Columbus Ohio State University Press, 2014. ISBN 0814293654.
- Sex in Antiquity: Exploring Gender and Sexuality in the Ancient World (co-editor with Mark Masterson and James Robson). London; New York, NY: Routledge, 2015. ISBN 0415519411.
