= 51st Daytime Creative Arts & Lifestyle Emmy Awards =

- Date: June 8, 2024
- Location: Westin Bonaventure Hotel; Los Angeles, California, U.S.
- Presented by: National Academy of Television Arts and Sciences (NATAS)
- Most awards: African Queens: Njinga and Live to 100: Secrets of the Blue Zones (3)
- Most nominations: African Queens: Njinga (12)

Television/radio coverage
- Network: Watch.TheEmmys.TV

The 51st Annual Daytime Creative Arts Emmy Awards, presented by the National Academy of Television Arts and Sciences (NATAS), honored the best in US daytime television programming in 2023. The award ceremony took place on June 8, 2024, at the Westin Bonaventure Hotel in Los Angeles.

The nominations were announced on April 19, 2024, alongside the nominees for the main ceremony categories. Netflix's docudrama series African Queens: Njinga led the creative arts nominations with twelve, followed by the miniseries Live to 100: Secrets of the Blue Zones and the talk show The Kelly Clarkson Show, both with six nominations each.

The ceremony was streamed on the NATAS OTT channel at Watch. TheEmmys. TV and via The Emmys apps for iOS, tvOS, Android, FireTV, and Roku.

== Winners and nominees ==
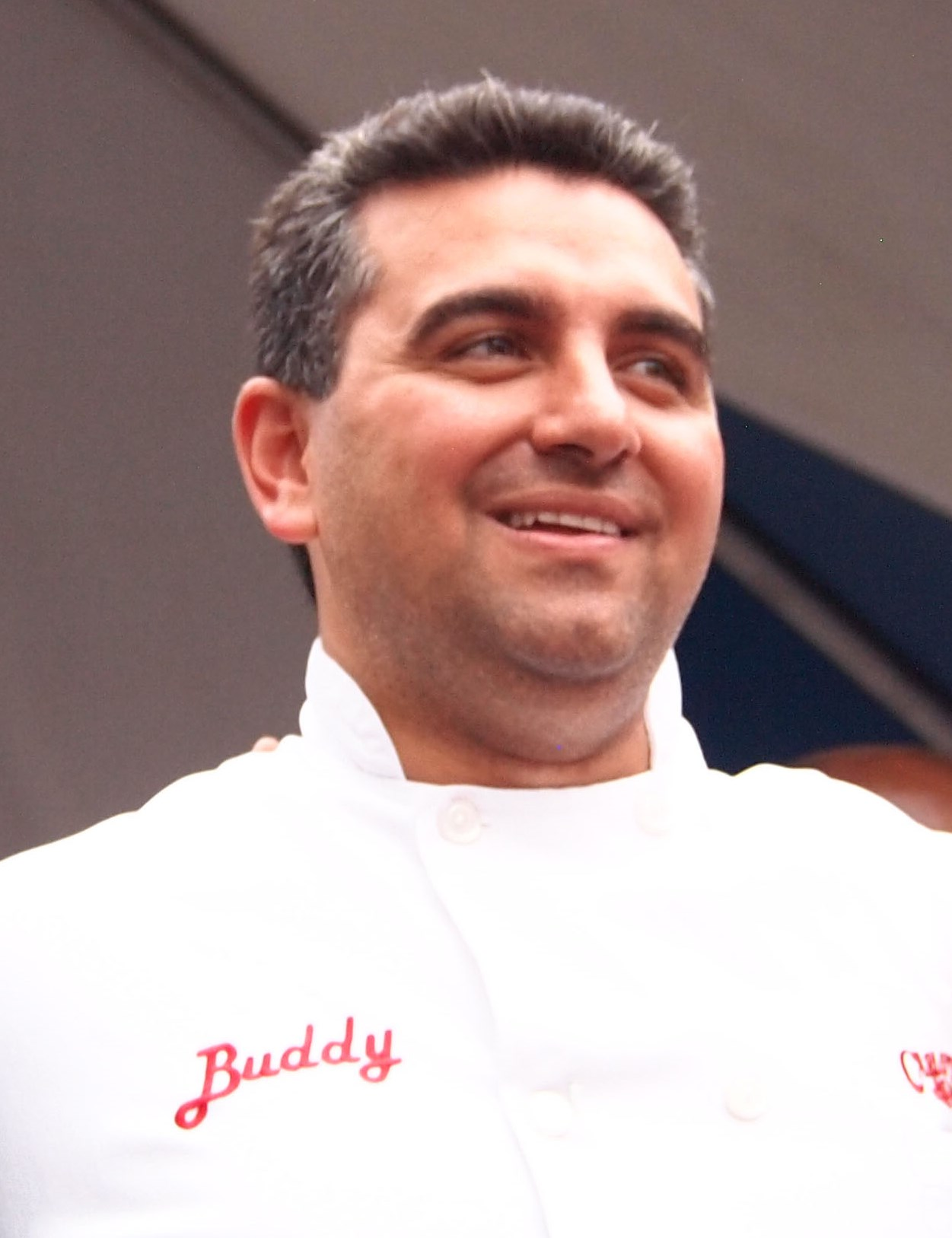
Buddy Valastro, Outstanding Culinary Show Host winner

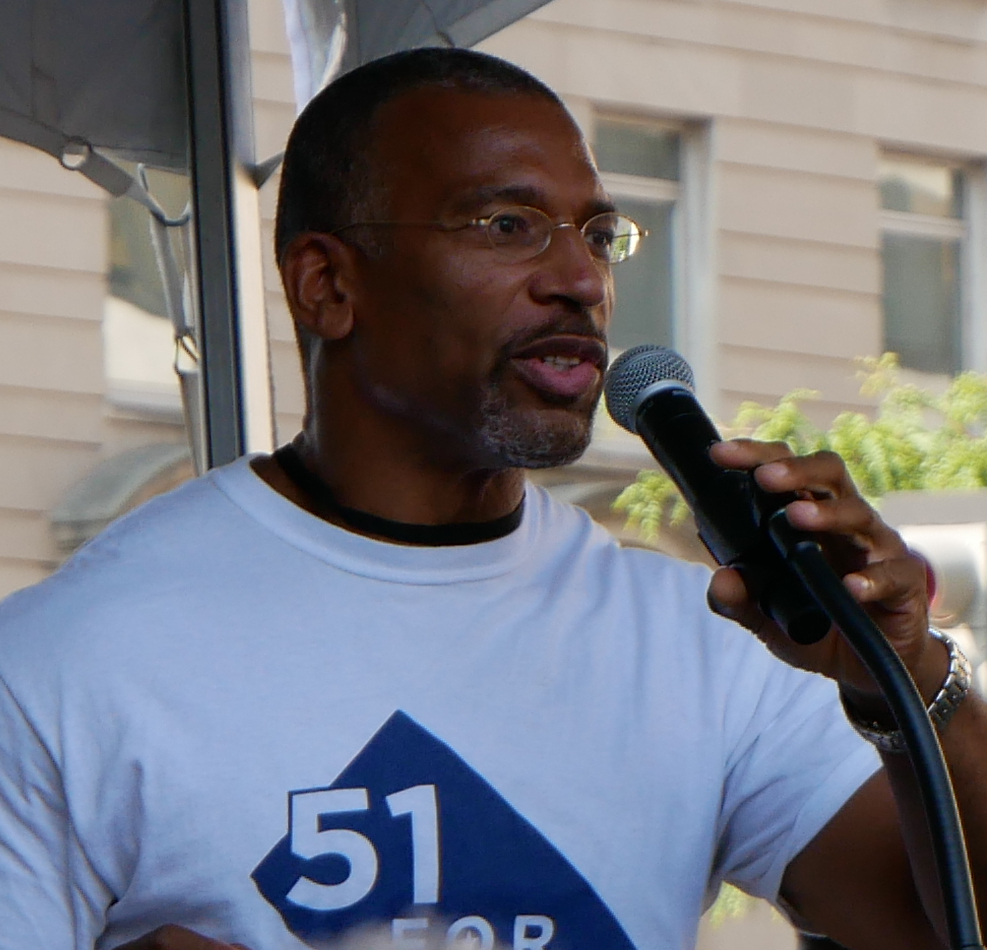
Christian Cooper, Outstanding Personality – Non Daily winner

The nominations for both the 51st Daytime Emmy Awards and the 51st Daytime Creative Arts & Lifestyle Emmy Awards were announced on April 19, 2024.

=== Programming ===
Programming
Outstanding Legal/Courtroom Program: Judy Justice (Freevee); Hot Bench (Syndicated); Justice for the People with Judge Milan (Syndicated); The People's Court (Syndicated); We the People (Syndicated)	Outstanding Lifestyle Program: Downey's Dream Cars (Max); George to the Rescue (NBC); Growing Floret (Magnolia Network); Homegrown (Magnolia Network); Live to 100: Secrets of the Blue Zones (Netflix)
Outstanding Travel, Adventure and Nature Program: Animals Up Close with Bertie Gregory (National Geographic); Extraordinary Birder with Christian Cooper (National Geographic); Guy's All-American Road Trip (Food Network); Mutual of Omaha's Wild Kingdom Protecting the Wild (NBC); Street Somm (Tastemade)	Outstanding Instructional and How-To Program: Hack My Home (Netflix); Fixer to Fabulous (HGTV); Fixer Upper: The Hotel (Magnolia Network); Martha Gardens (Roku); Windy City Rehab (HGTV)
Outstanding Arts and Popular Culture Program: Oprah and The Color Purple Journey (Max); Billion Dollar Babies: The True Story of the Cabbage Patch Kids (Vimeo); King of Collectibles: The Goldin Touch (Netflix); Off Script with The Hollywood Reporter (SundanceTV); Variety Studio: Actors on Actors (PBS); Working in the Theatre (AmericanTheatreWing.org)	Outstanding Daytime Special: Culture Quest: Ukraine (PBS); Disney Parks Magical Christmas Day (ABC); 97th Annual Macy's Thanksgiving Day (NBC); Recipe for Change: Celebrating Black Men (SpringHill); Unexpected (Hulu)
Outstanding Short Form Daytime Program: The Dads (Netflix); Catalyst (LinkedIn News); Hollywood Atelier: Rob Pickens (The Hollywood Reporter); How Una Pizza Napoletana Became the No.1 Ranked Pizza in the World (Eater); Temple of Film: 100 Years of the Egyptian Theatre (Netflix)	Outstanding Educational and Informational Program: Leveling Lincoln (PBS); African Queens: Njinga (Netflix); Harlem Globetrotters Play It Forward (NBC); Ireland Made with Love (PBS); What Really Happened: America's Wild West (National Geographic)

=== Hosting & Daytime Personality ===
Crafts
Outstanding Culinary Show Host: Buddy Valastro – Legends of the Fork (A&E); Lidia Bastianich – 25 Years with Lidia: A Culinary Jubilee (PBS); Valerie Bertinelli – Valerie's Home Cooking (Food Network); Eduardo Garcia – Big Sky Kitchen with Eduardo Garcia (Magnolia Network); Emeril Lagasse – Emeril Cooks (Roku); Sophia Roe – Counter Space (Tastemade)	Outstanding Personality – Non Daily: Christian Cooper – Extraordinary Birder with Christian Cooper (National Geographic); Samantha Brown – Samantha Brown's Places to Love (PBS); Derrick Campana – The Wizard of Paws (BYUtv); Zoë François, Andrew Zimmern – Holiday Party with Andrew and Zoë (Magnolia Network); Jet Tila – Ready Jet Cook (Food Network)

=== Crafts ===
Crafts
Outstanding Art Direction/Set Decoration/Scenic Design: African Queens: Njinga – Warren Gray (Netflix); The Kelly Clarkson Show – James Pearse Connelly, David Eckert, Jason Kirschner, Kait Taylor, and Kevin Grace (Syndicated); The Drew Barrymore Show – Diann Duthie, Tom Lenz, Mel Lovrik, and Lauren Ringer (Syndicated); General Hospital – Jennifer Elliott and Andrew Evashchen (ABC); The View – Mark Erbaugh and Jason Kirschner (ABC); The Young and the Restless – David Hoffmann, Jennifer Savala, Maria Dirolf, Jennifer Haybach, Monica Lowe, and Justine Mercado (CBS)	Outstanding Casting: African Queens: Njinga – Olissa Rogers and Christa Schamberger (Netflix); Days of Our Lives – Marnie Saitta and Bob Lambert (Peacock); General Hospital – Mark Teschner and Lisa Booth (ABC); Start Up – Jenny Feterovich (PBS); The Young and the Restless – Nancy Nayor and Greg Salmon (CBS)
Outstanding Cinematography: Animals Up Close with Bertie Gregory – Bertie Gregory and Sam Stewart (National Geographic); African Queens: Njinga – Kabelo Thathe (Netflix); Live to 100: Secrets of the Blue Zones – David Bolen and Brandon Somerhalder (Netflix); Living for the Dead – Jacob Tawney, Adrian Stucker, and John Mokhtarei Taylor (Hulu); Oracles of God: The Story of the Old Testament – Haim Asias (CBN)	Outstanding Costume Design/Styling: The Bold and the Beautiful – Jeresa Featherstone, Anabel Schuckhart, Lucy Flores, Jennifer Johns, Patrice Johnson, Ross Fuentes, Gail Mosley, and Angelo Santos (CBS); African Queens: Njinga – Dihantus Engelbrecht (Netflix); The Jennifer Hudson Show – Jacey Stamler, Verneccia Étienne, Oakley Stevenson, Tiffany McPherson, and Layla Witmer (Syndicated); Sherri – Willie Sinclair III and Chanel Smith (Syndicated)
Outstanding Hairstyling and Makeup: African Queens: Njinga – Gale Shepherd (Netflix); The Drew Barrymore Show – Daniel Howell, Toni Coburn, Joanna Pisani, and Lauren Gulino (Syndicated); Sherri – Theo Barrett, Rodney Jon, Yanira Garcia, Diana Mota, Irving Ramirez, and Jai Williams (Syndicated); The View – Rebecca Borman, Rosa Amoedo, Ryan Burrell, Joedson Gomes, Derick Monroe, Dora Smagler, Matthew Yates, Lynette Broom, Karen Dupiche, Veronica Ibarra, Celeste Ruggieri, Adrienne Gagnier, Etsuko Tsuiimoto, and Kyle Krueger (ABC); The Young and the Restless – Lauren Mendoza, Stacey Browning, Leticia Arellano, Michelle Corona, Justin Jackson, Diana Santana, Robert Bolger, James Elle, Melina Farhadi, Amanda Goldstein, and Riley Nightingall (CBS)	Outstanding Directing Team for a Single Camera Daytime Non-Fiction Program: Live to 100: Secrets of the Blue Zones – Clay Jeter (Netflix); African Queens: Njinga – Ethosheia Hylton (Netflix); Billion Dollar Babies: The True Story of the Cabbage Patch Kids – Andrew Jenks (Vimeo); Mutual of Omaha's Wild Kingdom Protecting the Wild – Justin Kelly and Sarah Kotzman (NBC); Searching for Soul Food – Rodney Lucas (Hulu); TrueSouth – Timothy Horgan (ESPN / ABC / SEC Network)
Outstanding Directing Team for a Multiple Camera Daytime Non-Fiction Program: The View – Sarah de la O, Jenean Elkins, John Keegan, Craig Viechec, Christopher Wayne, Rob Bruce Baron, Paul Tarascio, and Edward Valk (ABC); Disney Parks Magical Christmas Day – Sam Wrench, Ken Diego, Matt Goldstein, Lizz Zanin, Alissa Hoyo, Ron Paul, Jackie Paul, and Jeff Pearl (ABC); The Kelly Clarkson Show – Joe Terry, Diana Horn, Callan Chapman, Brendan Higgins, Chris Hines, Ran Lowe, Cyndi Owgang, and David Salas (Syndicated); The Drew Barrymore Show – Scot Titelbaum, Sara Tannor, Veda Carey, and Liz Keane (Syndicated); Turning The Tables with Robin Roberts – Adrian Pruett (Disney+)	Outstanding Single Camera Editing: Drive with Swizz Beatz – Max Rosenfeld, Lauren Staller, Sujit Agrawal, Jared Aston, Ben Bolton, Jordan Browne, Katie Covell, Sherman Pascoe, Lyric Ramsey, Ashley Rath, and Matt Valdez (Hulu); African Queens: Njinga – Jennifer Asheitu Hampson, Les Healey, Jamie Kataky, and Ben Lavington Martin (Netflix); Live to 100: Secrets of the Blue Zones – Zimo Huang, Julian Robinson, and Patrick Welch (Netflix); Oprah and The Color Purple Journey – Jay Eckensberger, Breia White, and David Fisher (Max); Searching for Soul Food – Martinos Artisidou, Paul Bonnano, Marc Otto, Evaide Ridore, Jessica Schilling, Cami Starkman, Eric Torres, and Jann Vartia (Hulu)
Outstanding Multiple Camera Editing: TrueSouth – Joe Canali, Timothy Horgan, and Dave Lynch (ESPN / ABC / SEC Network); Family Ingredients – Renea Gavrilov Stewart, Daniel Bernardoni, and Ty Sanga (PBS); The Kelly Clarkson Show – Stas Lipovetskiy, Klifford Svatos, Joseph Falci, Leah Simpson, and Sam Goldfien (Syndicated); Team Rubicon – Michael Svirsky, Adam Bush, Deb Luchini, Gregory William Palmer, Sara Hoye Peter Hyzak, Keishen Lloyd, Robert Kirwan, Mark Montalto, and Brian Patriacca (Roku); The Wizard of Paws – Joe Kirchner, Roger Ghaman, Michelle McConville, Taylor Servedio, and Ryan Walker (BYUtv)	Outstanding Music Direction and Composition: Live to 100: Secrets of the Blue Zones – Steve Gernes, Tyler Sabbag, and Duncan Thum (Netflix); African Queens: Njinga – Michael "Mikey" J Asante (Netflix); Mutual of Omaha's Wild Kingdom Protecting the Wild – Evan Frankfort (NBC); Mysteries of the Faith – Rob Lewis (Netflix); Temple of Film: 100 Years of the Egyptian Theatre – Amotz Plessner, Anny Colvin, and Pilar Fitzgerald (Netflix)
Outstanding Original Song: Reconnecting Roots: "We're Home" – Heidi Feek, Dillon Hodges, and Mandy McCauley (PBS); General Hospital: "Shine" – Derek Ryan Deblieux, Douglas Ladnier, John Shartzer, and Jophielle Love Kindar-Martin (ABC); Unexpected: "Unexpected Truth" – B.Slade (Hulu)	Outstanding Lighting Direction: The Kelly Clarkson Show – Darren Langer and John Daniels (Syndicated); The Jennifer Hudson Show – Tom Beck, Kevin Cauley, and Brian Freidin (Syndicated); General Hospital – Robert Bessoir, Melanie Mohr, and George Webster (ABC); The View – James Gallagher (ABC)
Outstanding Technical Direction, Camera Work, Video: Disney Parks Magical Christmas Day – Ryan Balton, John Diperna, Travis Elkins, Tony Martin, Rick Siegel, Billy Butler, James Coker, Deb Brozina, Chris Ferguson, Ricky Fontanez, Shaun Harkins, Travis Hays, Tom Hildreth, Jill Sager, and Fed Wetherbee (ABC); The Bold and the Beautiful – Gary Chamberlin, Keven Scotti, Michael Hardiman, Jack Kidd, Jr., Peter Mallard, John H. Carlson, Nick Krotov, Joseph Stephenson, Nicholas Svoboda, and George Forbes (CBS); Days of Our Lives – John Bromberek Jr., John Sizemore, Alexis Dellar Hanson, John Boyd, Steve Clark, Michael Denton, and Mark Warshaw (Peacock); The Kelly Clarkson Show – Tom Henson, Dan Stella, Dean Andersen, Ralph Bolton, Mark Britt, Franco Coello, Drew Jansen, Eric Kendra, Dick Mort, Richard Pitpit, Eric Taylor, Jimmy Tufaro, and Wade Bobbitt (Syndicated)	Outstanding Live Sound Mixing and Sound Editing: The Kelly Clarkson Show – James Slanger, Bob Lewis, Omalati Beckett, Eddie Marquez, Robert Venable, Danny Cruz, Jeff Hickman, Rosa Howell Thornhill, Jennifer Vannoy-Rounsaville, Bryan Smith, Marilyn Vigilante, Rachel Orscher, and Kevin Shannon (Syndicated); The Jennifer Hudson Show – Mike Stock, Liz Cabral, Liz Cabral, Tig Moore, Tig Moore, Josue Pena, Philip A. Gebhardt, Marilyn Loud, Sharon Sanchez, Sharron Sanchez, and Ron Thompson (Syndicated); The Talk – Chris Rich, Brent Arledge, Greg Ferrera, Krista Fetterer, Rod Iacono, Eric Slaughter, and Barry Warrick (CBS); Tamron Hall – Robert Blakney, Steve Giampaolo, Richard Hill, Yolanda Wright, Victor Lam, Sylvester Lewis, Jorge Silva, and Daychia Sledge (Syndicated)
Outstanding Sound Mixing and Sound Editing: Live to 100: Secrets of the Blue Zones – Phil Detolve, A. Josh Reinhardt, Graham Barclay, and Louie Recinos (Netflix); African Queens: Njinga – Stephen O'Toole (Netflix); Downey's Dream Cars – Jon Tropea, Matt Agosta, Eric Bini, Jeremy Bond, Mike Budzik, Jordan Bush, Mark Gardner, Michael Guggino, Josh Norton, Katiene Norton, Christina Pomales, Craig Rhee, and Joshua Tucker (Max); Drive with Swizz Beatz – Ryan Young and Graham Barclay (Hulu); Temple of Film: 100 Years of the Egyptian Theatre – Jeremy Grody, Christian Lainez, and Keith Bilderbeck (Netflix)	Outstanding Main Title and Graphic Design: Searching for Soul Food – Carson Hood, Kristen Pritchett, Eun Sung Do, Paolo Garcia, Sohyun Park, Mark Thompson, Addy Afzali, Lui Chia-lung, and Carl Dempsey (Hulu); African Queens: Njinga – Alexander Somerset Cater and Alex Briggs (Netflix); Car Masters: Rust to Riches – Kimberly Hager and Brandon Thomas Irwin (Netflix); Super Animals – Kane Fitzgerald, Tim Johnson, Brendan McCullough, Mike Novak, Robby Rotfeld, Steve Santiago, Jason Stewart, Mike Varga, and Mark Wawrzenski (Syndicated); Tex Mex Motors – Brandon Thomas Irwin and Kimberly Hager (Netflix)
Outstanding Writing Team for a Daytime Non-Fiction Program: Reconnecting Roots – Dave Boyd, Ryan Estabrooks, Joel McAfee, Gabe McCauley, Josh Childs, Emma King, Asia Mechikoff, Ben Oddo, Julian Vaca, and Wesley Vis (PBS); African Queens: Njinga – Nnenne Iwuji-eme and Peres Owino (Netflix); Mutual of Omaha's Wild Kingdom Protecting the Wild – Aaron Bauer and Chad Gajadhar (NBC); Super Animals – Aaron Abramowitz, Matt Gibson, Liz Reph, Steve Rotfeld, and Susie Ryan (Syndicated); Team Rubicon – John Tomlin, Katie Buckley, Beth Chambers, Chris Ermides, and Rebecca Galvin (Roku)

=== Nominations and wins by program ===
Shows with multiple Creative Arts nominations
Nominations	Show	Network
12	African Queens: Njinga	Netflix
6	Live to 100: Secrets of the Blue Zones	Netflix
6	The Kelly Clarkson Show	Syndicated
5	The View	ABC
4	Mutual of Omaha's Wild Kingdom Protecting the Wild	NBC
4	General Hospital	ABC
3	The Young and the Restless	CBS
3	Disney Parks Magical Christmas Day	ABC
3	Searching for Soul Food	Hulu
3	Temple of Film: 100 Years of the Egyptian Theatre	Netflix
3	The Drew Barrymore Show	Syndicated
3	The Jennifer Hudson Show	Syndicated
2	Days of Our Lives	Peacock
2	Downey's Dream Cars	Max
2	Oprah and The Color Purple Journey	Max
2	Unexpected	Hulu
2	Drive with Swizz Beatz	Hulu
2	Reconnecting Roots	PBS
2	The Bold and the Beautiful	CBS
2	Animals Up Close with Bertie Gregory	National Geographic
2	Extraordinary Birder with Christian Cooper	National Geographic
2	Billion Dollar Babies: The True Story of the Cabbage Patch Kids	Vimeo
2	Team Rubicon	Roku
2	TrueSouth	ESPN / ABC / SEC Network
2	The Wizard of Paws	BYUtv
2	Sherri	Syndicated
2	Super Animals	Syndicated
