= Dan Buettner =

American explorer, writer and film producer

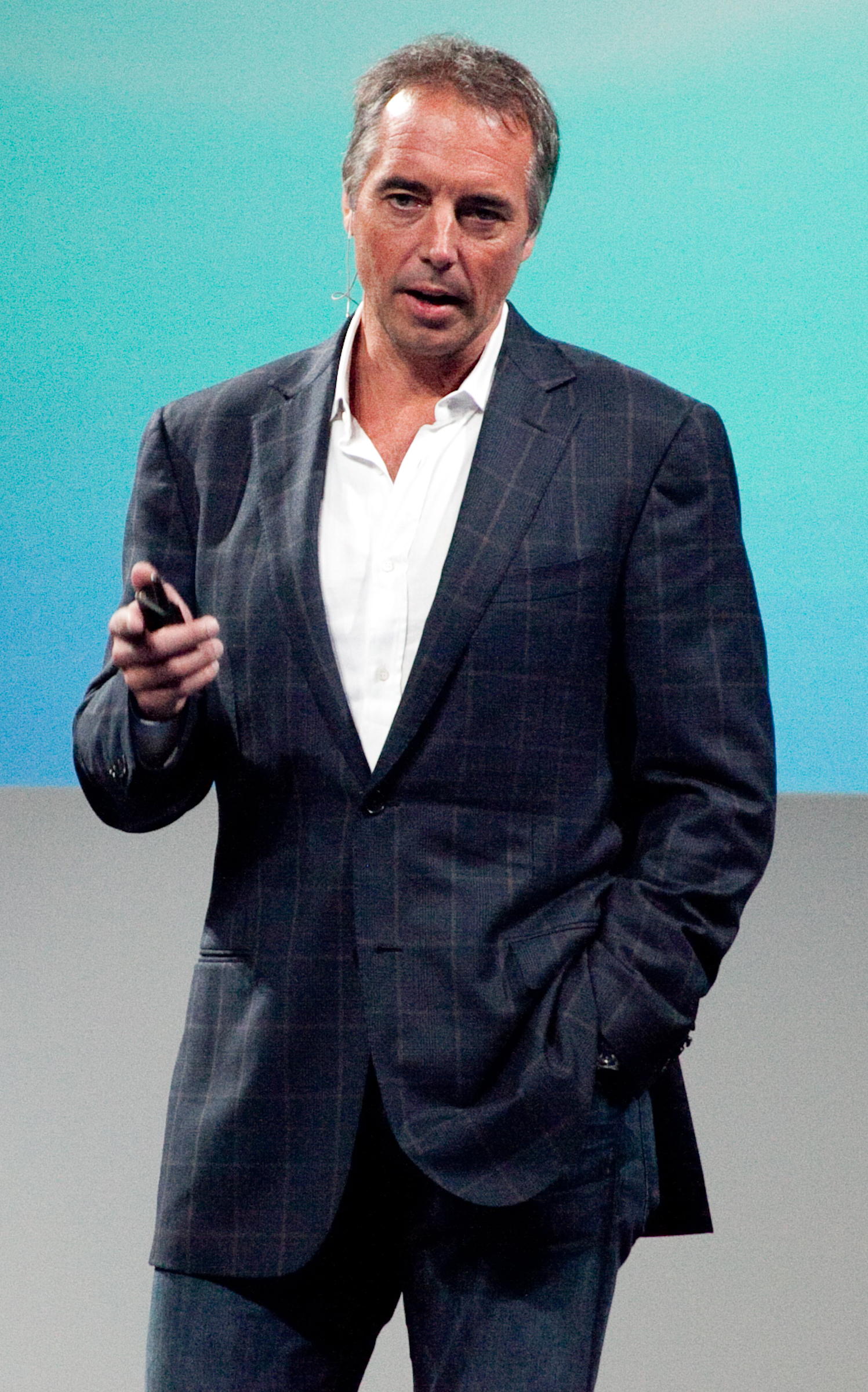
- Buettner in October 2010
- Born: June 18, 1960 (age 66); Saint Paul, Minnesota, United States
- Education: University of St. Thomas (Minnesota) (BA)
- Occupations: explorer; author; educator
- Writing career
- Subject: Blue Zones
- Notable works: ‘’The Blue Zones’’ (2008); The Blue Zones Kitche (2019); Live to 100: Secrets of the Blue Zones (2023)
- Notable awards: 3 Daytime Emmy Awards (2024)
- Website: danbuettner.com

Dan Buettner (born June 18, 1960) is an American writer, cookbook author, longevity researcher, and public speaker, best known for his research on the Blue Zones. He co-produced and hosted the three-time Emmy Award winning Netflix series Live to 100: Secrets of the Blue Zones (2023), holds three Guinness records for distance cycling, is the founder of Blue Zones, LLC, and is a National Geographic Fellow.

Buettner is a promoter of predominantly plant-based diets, and has authored numerous books on the subject. He has described his own diet as "98% plant-based".

== Biography ==
Buettner was born on June 18, 1960, in Saint Paul, Minnesota. Buettner graduated with a BA in Spanish and Literature from the University of St. Thomas in 1983.

Soon thereafter he went to work for The Washington Post columnist Remar Sutton. Later he took a job with National Public Radio in Washington, D.C., to recruit celebrity participation in a fund-raising croquet tournament with journalist George Plimpton of Paris Review.

In 1986, Buettner launched the first of several Guinness World Records for transcontinental cycling. "Americastrek" traversed 15,536 miles (25,003 km), from Prudhoe Bay, Alaska, to Tierra del Fuego, Argentina; the 1990 "Sovietrek", during which Dan was joined by his brother Steve, followed the 45th parallel around the world and covered 12,888 miles (20,741 km), as Buettner recounted the trip in his book Sovietrek. In 1992, in "Africatrek", the Buettner brothers team-cycled from Bizerte, Tunisia, to Cape Agulhas, South Africa, with cyclist Dr. Chip Thomas, covering 11,885 miles (19,127 km) over eight months.

== National Geographic ==
Buettner approached National Geographic Magazine with the idea to research supposed longevity hotspots, and was given support to move forward. In 2003, Buettner began leading trips to Sardinia, Italy; Okinawa, Japan; Monterrey, Nuevo Leon; and then Loma Linda, California. Buettner reported on these communities in his cover story for the National Geographic November 2005 edition, "Secrets of Long Life."

In 2006, Buettner collaborated with Michel Poulain and Costa Rican demographer Dr. Luis Rosero-Bixby, to identify a fourth possible longevity hotspot in the Nicoya Peninsula. In 2008, again working with Poulain, he proposed a fifth longevity location on the Greek Island of Ikaria. In April 2008, Buettner released a book on his findings, The Blue Zones: Lessons for Living Longer From the People Who've Lived the Longest, through National Geographic Books.

In April 2015, Buettner published The Blue Zones Solution: Eating and Living Like the World's Healthiest People, which listed various places with assumed longevity. It became a New York Times Best Seller.

== Blue zones ==
The concept of the blue zones (regions suspected as having unusually high lifespans) was originally developed by Michel Poulain, a demographer specializing in longevity studies, who proposed five of the six "blue zones." Given the nature of the research, the blue zones concept included Buettner as a colleague.

In 2025, Poulain and Anne Herm noted the National Geographic publication by Buettner on the blue zones in 2005. Adventist Health acquired Blue Zones LLC in 2020, and in 2024, Blue Zones LLC announced a partnership with The American College of Lifestyle Medicine.

=== AARP/Blue Zones Vitality Project ===
In 2008, Buettner chose Albert Lea, Minnesota, for the AARP/Blue Zones Vitality Project, where he believed the key to success involved focusing on the ecology of health—creating a healthy environment rather than relying on individual behaviors.

As a whole, the community showed an 80% increase in walking and biking, 49% decrease in city worker's healthcare claims, and 4% reduction in smoking, with city officials reporting a 40% drop in health care costs.

In 2010, Buettner partnered with Healthways to work on the Blue Zones Project.The Blue Zones Project team partnered with Beach Cities Health District in Southern California to apply blue zone principles to three California communities—Redondo Beach, Hermosa Beach, and Manhattan Beach.

In 2011, the Blue Zones Project joined forces with Wellmark Blue Cross and Blue Shield to deliver the Blue Zones Project across the State of Iowa as the cornerstone of the Governor's Healthiest State Initiative and is at work in 18 cities there to effect change. In 2013, projects began in Fort Worth, Texas, and in Hilo, Hawaii.

In 2014, work began in Naples, Florida, South Bend, Indiana, and Klamath Falls, Oregon.

=== Live to 100: Secrets of the Blue Zones (2023) ===
In 2023, Buettner co-produced and hosted the Netflix series Live to 100: Secrets of the Blue Zones, which explores the possibility of global longevity zones and lifestyle habits. On the review aggregator website Rotten Tomatoes, 100% of 7 critics' reviews are positive, with an average rating of 7.5/10.

The series was nominated for six, and won three, Daytime Emmy Awards in June 2024.

=== Research on Blue Zones ===
A 2026 study of factors assessing long-lived populations in Sardinia, Okinawa, Ikaria, and Nicoya cross-checked civil birth and death records, church archives, and genealogical records to minimize false-age claims and rely on population-level survival patterns rather than individual outliers. While the study acknowledged that modernization can cause longevity patterns to shift or disappear, it proposed that these regions serve as "natural laboratories" for understanding how lifestyle, diet, and social connectivity may contribute to healthy aging.

A 2025 review of the same four blue zones used a three-step method to qualify a long-life zone: strict age validation to confirm longevity; demographic indicators to identify population longevity; and longevity criteria proving a significant number of individuals with at least 50% longer lives than the national average. Core longevity factors found in this study were diet, physical activity, social support, and environment. The authors concluded "with reasonable confidence that these blue zones of exceptional longevity do indeed exist, even if there are indications that this exceptionality is transient and may be transitory. Given the rapid aging of populations in many modern societies, blue zones should be considered as a valuable model for promoting longer, healthier, and happier lives."

== Criticism of the Blue Zone concept ==
A 2021 review stated that there are no controlled studies of elderly people in the blue zones as promoted by Buettner, and that blue zone diets are based on speculation, having no evidence obtained through a rigorous scientific method.

A 2024 review challenged the concept of blue zone communities having exceptional longevity, arguing that there is an absence of scientific evidence relating community lifestyle to longevity. The review also stated that the blue zone concept spurred a profitable business empire initiated by Buettner to produce "books, diets, a multimillion-dollar company, and a Netflix series — all aimed at imparting at least some of those secrets to an eager audience."

== Public speaking ==
- Bill Clinton's Global Initiative, 2013
- TEDxTC 2009 (Minneapolis/St. Paul), independently organized TED event. Buettner gave a TED talk on his work sponsored by the National Geographic entitled "How to live to be 100+", which, as of 18 May 2024 had over 4.7 million views.

== Personal life ==
Buettner dated American model Cheryl Tiegs until 2009.

== Bibliography ==
- Buettner, Dan (1994). Sovietrek: A Journey by Bicycle Across Russia. Lerner Publishing Group. ISBN 0-8225-2950-5.
- Buettner, Dan (1996). Maya Quest: Interactive Expedition. Douglas Mason (illustrator). Onion Press. ISBN 0-9640334-2-9.
- Buettner, Dan (1997). Africatrek: A Journey by Bicycle Through Africa. Lerner Publishing Group. ISBN 0-8225-2951-3.
- Buettner, Dan (2008). The Blue Zones: Lessons for Living Longer From the People Who've Lived the Longest. National Geographic Books. ISBN 978-1-4262-0274-2.
- Buettner, Dan (2010). Thrive. Finding Happiness the Blue Zones Way. National Geographic Books. ISBN 978-1-4262-0818-8.
- Buettner, Dan (2012). The Blue Zones, Second Edition: 9 Lessons for Living Longer From the People Who've Lived the Longest. National Geographic Books. ISBN 978-1426209482.
- Buettner, Dan (2015). The Blue Zones Solution: Eating and Living Like the World's Healthiest People. National Geographic Books. ISBN 978-1426211928.
- Buettner, Dan, (2017). The Blue Zones of Happiness: Lessons from the World's Happiest People. Washington, D.C.: National Geographic ISBN 978-1-4262-1848-4.
- Buettner, Dan (2021). The Blue Zones Challenge: A 4-Week Plan for a Longer Better Life. National Geographic Books. ISBN 978-1426221941.

=== Cookbooks ===
- Buettner, Dan (2019). The Blue Zones Kitchen: 100 Recipes to Live to 100. Washington, D.C.: National Geographic. ISBN 978-1426220135.
- Buettner, Dan (2022). The Blue Zones American Kitchen: 100 Recipes to Live to 100. National Geographic Books. ISBN 978-1426222474.
- Buettner, Dan (2023). The Blue Zones: Secrets for Living Longer. National Geographic Books. ISBN 978-1426223471.
- Buettner, Dan (2025). The Blue Zones Kitchen One Pot Meals:100 Recipes to Live to 100. National Geographic Books. ISBN 978-1-4262-2412-6
