= Tallinn University =

University in Tallinn, Estonia

- Tallinna Ülikool
- Motto: Promoter of Intelligent Lifestyle
- Type: Public
- Established: 1919; 107 years ago, 2005; 21 years ago
- Affiliations: EUA, UNICA, EUA-CDE, Magna-Charta, BUP, ATEE, ENAI, ENIHEI, FilmEU
- President: Tõnu Viik
- Faculty: 475 (2023)
- Administrative staff: 371 (2023)
- Students: 6,843 (2023)
- Undergraduates: 3,927 (2023)
- Postgraduates: 2,629 (2023)
- Doctoral students: 287 (2023)
- Location: Tallinn, Harju County, Estonia; 59°26′19″N 24°46′17″E
- Mascot: Eksmati
- Website: www.tlu.ee

University rankings

Regional – Overall
- QS Emerging Europe and Central Asia: 72 (2022)

Tallinn University (TLU; Estonian: Tallinna Ülikool, TLÜ) is a public research university in Estonia. Located in the centre of Tallinn, the capital city of Estonia, Tallinn University is one of the three largest institutions of higher education in the country. Both QS World University and Times Higher Education rankings place it among the top 1000 universities in the world.

== History ==
Tallinn University is the third oldest university in Estonia, as its predecessor, Tallinn Pedagogical University (Estonian: Tallinna Pedagoogikaülikool), was founded in 1919. Tallinn University in its present form was established on 18 March 2005 as the result of a merger of several universities and research institutions in Tallinn.

== Academics ==
University rankings

Global – Overall
- QS World: 901-950 (2026)
- THE World: 801–1,000

As of 2023, about 7,000 degree students were enrolled at Tallinn University (with over 14,000 more taking part in continuing education programmes), making it the third largest provider of higher education in Estonia. Among degree students, 10% were international. There are 846 employees at the university, of which 475 are academic staff.

Tallinn University's Baltic Film, Media, Arts and Communication School is the only institution in Northern Europe teaching film, television and audiovisual production in English, and one of the largest film schools in the region. Its student body represents over 40 countries worldwide.

As of 2021 the Times Higher Education World Rankings ranked the university's research coefficient fourth highest in the Baltic States.

== Tallinn University campus ==
Tallinn University campus Terra building as seen from Narva maantee

The campus of Tallinn University is located in the center of Tallinn. The campus consists of six connected buildings which have Latin names: Terra, Astra, Mare, Nova, Silva and Vita. Between the buildings there is a campus courtyard.

Terra is the main and oldest building on Tallinn University's campus. It was built for the Tallinn English College in 1938. The building is under heritage protection. The Mare building was completed in 2006. The Nova building houses the Baltic Film and Media School and was completed in 2012, along with the Astra building. The Vita building was completed and opened in January 2020.

The University's Academic Library is located a short walk from the main campus. It was established as the Central Library for the Estonian Academy of Sciences in 1946; it became a part of the university in 2003.

Tallinn University campus virtual tour.

== Internationalisation ==
The university was ranked among the top 15 institutions in the Emerging Europe and Central Asia by the percentage of international faculty.

In 2023, Taiwan set up a Chinese Studies center in Tallinn University .

== Sports and culture ==
Tallinn University has a range of cultural and sport activities. The university has a symphony orchestra, men's choir, women's choir, and the folk dance group Soveldaja.

== Notable faculty ==
- Paul E. Beaudoin, American composer and music theorist
- Peeter Järvelaid, legal scholar and former advisor to the Estonian Ministry of Justice
- Richard Lomax, American educational psychologist (currently professor of education at Ohio State University)
- Mihhail Lotman, semiotician and politician
- Andres Luure, philosopher and translator
- Daniele Monticelli, Italian semiotician, translation scholar and translator
- Katrin Niglas(et)
- Hannes Palang(et)
- Michel Poulain, Belgian demographer, known for the concept of Blue Zone
- Tõnis Rätsep, lecturer, actor, musician and academic
- Rein Raud, professor of Cultural Theory and Japanese studies, writer and translator
- Pia Tikka, filmmaker and academic
