= Variety Studio: Actors on Actors =

American television series

- Genre: Talk show
- Created by: Michelle Sobrino-Stearns
- Country of origin: United States
- Original language: English
- No. of seasons: 24
- No. of episodes: 74

Production
- Executive producers: Donna Pennestri, Andrew Russell, Michelle Merker, Ramin Setoodeh
- Running time: 26–minutes
- Production companies: PBS SoCal; Variety Media

Original release
- Release: December 21, 2014 – present

Variety Studio: Actors on Actors, also referred to as Actors on Actors, is an American entertainment talk show television series co-produced by PBS SoCal and Variety Media. It premiered on PBS SoCal on December 21, 2014.

== Plot ==
Each episode brings together multiple pairs of actors engaging in intimate one-on-one discussions about their acting craft and work.

== Episodes ==
=== Season 1 (2014–15) ===
Episode 1:

- Benedict Cumberbatch (The Imitation Game) with Edward Norton (Birdman)
- Patricia Arquette (Boyhood) with Jake Gyllenhaal (Nightcrawler)
- Hilary Swank (The Homesman) with Tilda Swinton (Snowpiercer)
- Oscar Isaac (A Most Violent Year) with Gugu Mbatha-Raw (Belle)

Episode 2:

- Jessica Chastain (Interstellar) with Mark Ruffalo (Foxcatcher)
- Laura Dern (Wild) with Eddie Redmayne (The Theory of Everything)
- Josh Brolin (Inherent Vice) with J. K. Simmons (Whiplash)
- James Corden (Into the Woods) with Kevin Costner (Black or White)

Episode 3:

- Michael Keaton (Birdman) with Reese Witherspoon (Wild)
- Ethan Hawke (Boyhood) with Keira Knightley (The Imitation Game)
- Jack O'Connell (Unbroken) with David Oyelowo (Selma)
- Felicity Jones (The Theory of Everything) with Jenny Slate (Obvious Child)

Episode 4:

- Jennifer Aniston (Cake) with Emily Blunt (Into the Woods)
- Ralph Fiennes (The Grand Budapest Hotel) with Christoph Waltz (Big Eyes)
- Marion Cotillard (Two Days, One Night) with Timothy Spall (Mr. Turner)
- Chadwick Boseman (Get on Up) with Logan Lerman (Fury)

=== Season 2 (2015) ===
Episode 1:

- Julia Louis-Dreyfus (Veep) with Jeffrey Tambor (Transparent)
- Taraji P. Henson (Empire) with Queen Latifah (Bessie)
- Jessica Lange (American Horror Story) with Taylor Schilling (Orange Is the New Black)
- Maggie Gyllenhaal (The Honourable Woman) with Liev Schreiber (Ray Donovan)
- Bob Odenkirk (Better Call Saul) with Michael Sheen (Masters of Sex)

Episode 2:

- Don Cheadle (House of Lies) with Claire Danes (Homeland)
- Jesse Tyler Ferguson (Modern Family) with Matt LeBlanc (Episodes)
- Julianna Margulies (The Good Wife) with Clive Owen (The Knick)
- Viola Davis (How to Get Away with Murder) with Jane Fonda (Grace and Frankie)
- Uzo Aduba (Orange is the New Black) with Gina Rodriguez (Jane the Virgin)

=== Season 3 (2015–16) ===
Episode 1:

- Cate Blanchett (Carol and Truth) with Ian McKellen (Mr. Holmes)
- Benicio Del Toro (Sicario) with Will Smith (Concussion)
- Joel Edgerton (Black Mass) with Brie Larson (Room)
- Amy Schumer (Trainwreck) with Lily Tomlin (Grandma)

Episode 2:

- Saoirse Ronan (Brooklyn) with Kate Winslet (Steve Jobs)
- Elizabeth Banks (Love & Mercy) with Carey Mulligan (Suffragette)
- Steve Carell (The Big Short) with Rooney Mara (Carol)
- Bryan Cranston (Trumbo) with Jason Segel (The End of the Tour)

Episode 3:

- Jennifer Jason Leigh (The Hateful Eight) with Seth Rogen (Steve Jobs)
- Samuel L. Jackson (The Hateful Eight) with Michael Keaton (Spotlight)
- Paul Dano (Love & Mercy) with Joseph Gordon-Levitt (The Walk)
- Charlotte Rampling (45 Years) with Isabella Rossellini (Joy)

=== Season 4 (2016) ===
Episode 1:

- Jamie Lee Curtis (Scream Queens) with Lady Gaga (American Horror Story: Hotel)
- Tracee Ellis Ross (Black-ish) with Courtney B. Vance (American Crime Story)
- Felicity Huffman (American Crime) with Jennifer Lopez (Shades of Blue)
- Tom Hiddleston (The Night Manager) with Aaron Paul (The Path)
- Emilia Clarke (Game of Thrones) with Jay Duplass (Transparent)

Episode 2:

- Bobby Cannavale (Vinyl) with Sarah Paulson (American Crime Story)
- Rob Lowe (The Grinder) with John Travolta (American Crime Story)
- Aziz Ansari (Master of None) with Kerry Washington (Confirmation)
- Kirsten Dunst (Fargo) with Rami Malek (Mr. Robot)
- Thomas Middleditch (Silicon Valley) with Patrick Stewart (Blunt Talk)

=== Season 5 (2017) ===
Episode 1:

- Viola Davis (Fences) with Tom Hanks (Sully)
- Molly Shannon (Other People) with Emma Stone (La La Land)
- Casey Affleck (Manchester by the Sea) with Nicole Kidman (Lion)
- Jeff Bridges (Hell or High Water) with Matthew McConaughey (Gold)

Episode 2:

- Natalie Portman (Jackie) with Michelle Williams (Manchester by the Sea)
- Amy Adams (Arrival and Nocturnal Animals) with Andrew Garfield (Hacksaw Ridge)
- Taraji P. Henson (Hidden Figures) with Ryan Reynolds (Deadpool)
- Annette Bening (20th Century Women) with Naomie Harris (Moonlight)

Episode 3:

- Colin Farrell (The Lobster) with Hugh Grant (Florence Foster Jenkins)
- Adam Driver (Paterson) with Michael Shannon (Nocturnal Animals)
- Dev Patel (Lion) with Octavia Spencer (Hidden Figures)
- Sally Field (Hello, My Name Is Doris) with Hailee Steinfeld (The Edge of Seventeen)
- Mahershala Ali (Moonlight) with Greta Gerwig (20th Century Women)

=== Season 6 (2017) ===
Episode 1:

- Sarah Jessica Parker (Divorce) with Michelle Pfeiffer (The Wizard of Lies)
- Kevin Bacon (I Love Dick) with John Lithgow (The Crown)
- Thandie Newton (Westworld) with Oprah Winfrey (The Immortal Life of Henrietta Lacks)
- Freida Pinto (Guerrilla) with Milo Ventimiglia (This Is Us)
- Lauren Graham (Gilmore Girls: A Year in the Life) with Constance Zimmer (Unreal)

Episode 2:

- Nicole Kidman (Big Little Lies) with Ewan McGregor (Fargo)
- Pamela Adlon (Better Things) with Sterling K. Brown (This Is Us)
- Anthony Anderson (Black-ish) with Kaley Cuoco (The Big Bang Theory)
- Millie Bobby Brown (Stranger Things) with Evan Rachel Wood (Westworld)
- Riz Ahmed (The Night Of) with Elisabeth Moss (The Handmaid's Tale)
- Brit Marling (The OA) with Issa Rae (Insecure)

=== Season 7 (2018) ===
Episode 1:

- Jennifer Lawrence (Mother!) with Adam Sandler (The Meyerowitz Stories)
- Gary Oldman (Darkest Hour) with Kate Winslet (Wonder Wheel)
- Jake Gyllenhaal (Stronger) with Margot Robbie (I, Tonya)
- Saoirse Ronan (Lady Bird) with Kristen Wiig (Downsizing)
- Timothée Chalamet (Call Me by Your Name) with Daniel Kaluuya (Get Out)

Episode 2:

- Gal Gadot (Wonder Woman) with Kumail Nanjiani (The Big Sick)
- Willem Dafoe (The Florida Project) with Hugh Jackman (Logan)
- Mary J. Blige (Mudbound) with Salma Hayek (Beatriz at Dinner)
- Allison Janney (I, Tonya) with Sam Rockwell (Three Billboards Outside Ebbing, Missouri)

Episode 3:

- Jessica Chastain (Molly's Game) with Holly Hunter (The Big Sick)
- James Franco (The Disaster Artist) with Dustin Hoffman (The Meyerowitz Stories)
- Hong Chau (Downsizing) with Diane Kruger (In the Fade)
- Richard Jenkins (The Shape of Water) with Laurie Metcalf (Lady Bird)
- Jamie Bell (Film Stars Don't Die in Liverpool) with Robert Pattinson (Good Time)

=== Season 8 (2018) ===
Episode 1:

- Benedict Cumberbatch (Patrick Melrose) with Claire Foy (The Crown)
- Angela Bassett (9-1-1) with Laura Dern (The Tale)
- Darren Criss (American Crime Story) with Mandy Moore (This Is Us)
- Jason Bateman (Ozark) with Bill Hader (Barry)
- Jessica Biel (The Sinner) with Alison Brie (GLOW)

Episode 2:

- Debra Messing (Will & Grace) with Sharon Stone (Mosaic)
- Michael B. Jordan (Fahrenheit 451) with Issa Rae (Insecure)
- Jeff Daniels (The Looming Tower) with Laura Linney (Ozark)
- Tiffany Haddish (The Last O.G.) with John Legend (Jesus Christ Superstar Live in Concert)
- Edie Falco (Law & Order: True Crime) with J. K. Simmons (Counterpart)

=== Season 9 (2019) ===
Episode 1:

- Amy Adams (Vice) with Nicole Kidman (Boy Erased)
- Mahershala Ali (Green Book) with John David Washington (BlacKkKlansman)
- Felicity Jones (On the Basis of Sex) with Constance Wu (Crazy Rich Asians)

Episode 2:

- Melissa McCarthy (Can You Ever Forgive Me?) with Lupita Nyong'o (Black Panther)
- Timothée Chalamet (Beautiful Boy) with Emma Stone (The Favourite)
- Emily Blunt (Mary Poppins Returns and A Quiet Place) with Hugh Jackman (The Front Runner)

Episode 3:

- John Krasinski (A Quiet Place) with Rosamund Pike (A Private War)
- Michael B. Jordan (Creed II and Black Panther) with Charlize Theron (Tully)
- Maggie Gyllenhaal (The Kindergarten Teacher) with Regina King (If Beale Street Could Talk)

Episode 4:

- Glenn Close (The Wife) with Sam Elliott (A Star Is Born)
- Armie Hammer (On the Basis of Sex and Sorry to Bother You) with Dakota Johnson (Suspiria)
- Chadwick Boseman (Black Panther) with Viggo Mortensen (Green Book)

Episode 5:

- Lady Gaga (A Star Is Born) with Lin-Manuel Miranda (Mary Poppins Returns)

=== Season 10 (2019) ===
Episode 1:

- Patricia Arquette (Escape at Dannemora) with Julia Roberts (Homecoming)
- Amy Adams (Sharp Objects) with Richard Madden (Bodyguard)
- Taraji P. Henson (Empire) with Ellen Pompeo (Grey's Anatomy)

Episode 2:

- Benicio del Toro (Escape at Dannemora) with Michael Douglas (The Kominsky Method)
- Emilia Clarke (Game of Thrones) with Regina Hall (Black Monday)
- Sam Rockwell (Fosse/Verdon) with Renée Zellweger (What/If)

Episode 3:

- Chris Pine (I Am the Night) with Robin Wright (House of Cards)
- Patricia Clarkson (Sharp Objects) with Michelle Williams (Fosse/Verdon)
- Sacha Baron Cohen (Who Is America?) with Don Cheadle (Black Monday)

Episode 4:

- Rachel Brosnahan (The Marvelous Mrs. Maisel) with Billy Porter (Pose)
- Tracee Ellis Ross (Black-ish) with Sarah Paulson (American Horror Story)
- Natasha Lyonne (Russian Doll) with Maya Rudolph (Forever)

=== Season 11 (2020) ===
Episode 1:

- Tom Hanks (A Beautiful Day in the Neighborhood) with Renée Zellweger (Judy)
- Brad Pitt (Once Upon a Time in Hollywood) with Adam Sandler (Uncut Gems)
- Awkwafina (The Farewell) with Taron Egerton (Rocketman)

Episode 2:

- Antonio Banderas (Pain and Glory) with Eddie Murphy (Dolemite Is My Name)
- Chris Evans (Knives Out) with Scarlett Johansson (Marriage Story)
- Mindy Kaling (Late Night) with Constance Wu (Hustlers)

Episode 3:

- Adam Driver (Marriage Story) with Charlize Theron (Bombshell)
- Cynthia Erivo (Harriet) with Alfre Woodard (Clemency)
- Shia LaBeouf (Honey Boy) with Kristen Stewart (Seberg)

Episode 4:

- Jennifer Lopez (Hustlers) with Robert Pattinson (The Lighthouse)
- Sterling K. Brown (Waves) with Laura Dern (Marriage Story)
- Beanie Feldstein (Booksmart) with Florence Pugh (Little Women)

=== Season 12 (2020) ===
Episode 1:

- Regina King (Watchmen) with Reese Witherspoon (Little Fires Everywhere)
- Anne Hathaway (Modern Love) with Hugh Jackman (Bad Education)
- Kieran Culkin (Succession) with Dan Levy (Schitt’s Creek)

Episode 2:

- Sandra Oh (Killing Eve) with Kerry Washington (Little Fires Everywhere)
- Tessa Thompson (Westworld) with Ramy Youssef (Ramy)
- Russell Crowe (The Loudest Voice) with Nicole Kidman (Big Little Lies)

Episode 3:

- Jennifer Aniston (The Morning Show) with Lisa Kudrow (Space Force, The Good Place and Feel Good)
- Daveed Diggs (Snowpiercer) with Anthony Mackie (Altered Carbon)
- Henry Cavill (The Witcher) with Patrick Stewart (Star Trek: Picard)

Episode 4:

- Claire Danes (Homeland) with Damian Lewis (Billions)
- Zendaya (Euphoria) with Mj Rodriguez (Pose)
- Chris Evans (Defending Jacob) with Paul Rudd (Living with Yourself)

=== Season 13 (2021) ===
Episode 1:

- Jodie Foster (The Mauritanian) with Anthony Hopkins (The Father)
- Riz Ahmed (Sound of Metal) with Steven Yeun (Minari)

Episode 2:

- George Clooney (The Midnight Sky) with Michelle Pfeiffer (French Exit)
- Zendaya (Malcolm & Marie) with Carey Mulligan (Promising Young Woman)
- Glenn Close (Hillbilly Elegy) with Pete Davidson (The King of Staten Island)

Episode 3:

- Ben Affleck (The Way Back) with Sacha Baron Cohen (Borat Subsequent Moviefilm and The Trial of the Chicago 7)
- Andra Day (The United States vs. Billie Holiday) with Leslie Odom Jr. (One Night in Miami)
- Jared Leto (The Little Things) with John David Washington (Malcolm & Marie)

Episode 4:

- Jamie Dornan (Wild Mountain Thyme) with Eddie Redmayne (The Trial of the Chicago 7)
- Vanessa Kirby (Pieces of a Woman) with Amanda Seyfried (Mank)
- Tom Holland (Cherry) with Daniel Kaluuya (Judas and the Black Messiah)

=== Season 14 (2021) ===
Episode 1:

- Nicole Kidman (The Undoing) with Chris Rock (Fargo)
- Josh O'Connor (The Crown) with Anya Taylor-Joy (The Queen's Gambit)

Episode 2:

- Ewan McGregor (Halston) with Pedro Pascal (The Mandalorian)
- Kathryn Hahn (WandaVision) with Jason Sudeikis (Ted Lasso)

Episode 3:

- Kaley Cuoco (The Flight Attendant) with Elizabeth Olsen (WandaVision)
- Emma Corrin (The Crown) with Regé-Jean Page (Bridgerton)

Episode 4:

- Gillian Anderson (The Crown) with Elisabeth Moss (The Handmaid's Tale)
- Uzo Aduba (In Treatment) with Billy Porter (Pose)

=== Season 15 (2022) ===
Episode 1:

- Lady Gaga (House of Gucci) with Jake Gyllenhaal (The Guilty)
- Jessica Chastain (The Eyes of Tammy Faye) with Rita Moreno (West Side Story)
- Javier Bardem (Being the Ricardos) with Daniel Craig (No Time to Die)

Episode 2:

- Penélope Cruz (Parallel Mothers) with Benedict Cumberbatch (The Power of the Dog)
- Ariana DeBose (West Side Story) with Simu Liu (Shang-Chi and the Legend of the Ten Rings)
- Oscar Isaac (The Card Counter) with Jared Leto (House of Gucci)

Episode 3:

- Andrew Garfield (Tick, Tick... Boom! and The Eyes of Tammy Faye) with Rachel Zegler (West Side Story)
- Aunjanue Ellis (King Richard) with Regina King (The Harder They Fall)
- Jamie Dornan (Belfast) with Kirsten Dunst (The Power of the Dog)

Episode 4:

- Nicole Kidman (Being the Ricardos) with Kristen Stewart (Spencer)
- Marlee Matlin (CODA) with Bradley Whitford (Tick, Tick... Boom!)
- Mahershala Ali (Swan Song) with Bradley Cooper (Nightmare Alley and Licorice Pizza)

=== Season 16 (2022) ===
Episode 1:

- Viola Davis (The First Lady) with Samuel L. Jackson (The Last Days of Ptolemy Grey)
- Jennifer Aniston (The Morning Show) with Sebastian Stan (Pam & Tommy)
- Jared Leto (WeCrashed) with Amanda Seyfried (The Dropout)

Episode 2:

- Zendaya (Euphoria) with Andrew Garfield (Under the Banner of Heaven)
- Cynthia Nixon (And Just Like That and The Gilded Age) with Bowen Yang (Saturday Night Live)
- Courteney Cox (Shining Vale) with Faith Hill (1883)

Episode 3:

- Martin Short (Only Murders in the Building) with Jean Smart (Hacks)
- Jung Ho-yeon (Squid Game) with Sandra Oh (The Chair and Killing Eve)
- Tom Hiddleston (The Essex Serpent and Loki) with Lily James (Pam & Tommy)

Episode 4:

- Anne Hathaway (WeCrashed) with Jeremy Strong (Succession)
- Christina Ricci (Yellowjackets) with Sydney Sweeney (Euphoria)
- Quinta Brunson (Abbott Elementary) with Adam Scott (Severance)
- Josh Brolin (Outer Range) with Josh Brolin

=== Season 17 (2023) ===
Episode 1:

- Cate Blanchett (Tár) with Michelle Yeoh (Everything Everywhere All at Once)
- Kate Hudson (Glass Onion: A Knives Out Mystery) with Glen Powell (Top Gun: Maverick)
- Laura Dern (The Son) with Michelle Williams (The Fabelmans)

Episode 2:

- Carey Mulligan (She Said) with Margot Robbie (Babylon)
- Austin Butler (Elvis) with Janelle Monáe (Glass Onion: A Knives Out Mystery)
- John Boyega (The Woman King) with Letitia Wright (Black Panther: Wakanda Forever)

Episode 3:

- Viola Davis (The Woman King) with Jennifer Lawrence (Causeway)
- Jamie Lee Curtis (Everything Everywhere All at Once) with Colin Farrell (The Banshees of Inisherin)
- Brendan Fraser (The Whale) with Adam Sandler (Hustle)

Episode 4:

- Ana de Armas (Blonde) with Eddie Redmayne (The Good Nurse)
- Paul Dano (The Fabelmans) with Brian Tyree Henry (Causeway)
- Joe Alwyn (Stars at Noon) with Paul Mescal (Aftersun)

=== Season 18 (2023) ===
Episode 1:

- Emily Blunt (The English) with Brian Cox (Succession)
- Taron Egerton (Black Bird) with Rachel Weisz (Dead Ringers)
- Elle Fanning (The Great) with Jenna Ortega (Wednesday)

Episode 2:

- Pedro Pascal (The Last of Us) with Steven Yeun (Beef)
- Melanie Lynskey (Yellowjackets) with Natasha Lyonne (Poker Face)
- Kieran Culkin (Succession) with Claire Danes (Fleishman Is in Trouble)

Episode 3:

- Jennifer Garner (The Last Thing He Told Me) with Sheryl Lee Ralph (Abbott Elementary)
- Brett Goldstein (Ted Lasso) with Theo James (The White Lotus)
- Katherine Heigl (Firefly Lane) with Ellen Pompeo (Grey's Anatomy)

Episode 4:

- Jennifer Coolidge (The White Lotus) with Jeremy Allen White (The Bear)
- Jason Segel (Shrinking) with Ali Wong (Beef)
- Hayden Christensen (Obi-Wan Kenobi) with Diego Luna (Andor)

=== Season 19 (2024) ===
Episode 1:

- Cillian Murphy (Oppenheimer) with Margot Robbie (Barbie)
- Bradley Cooper (Maestro) with Emma Stone (Poor Things)

Episode 2:

- Robert Downey Jr. (Oppenheimer) with Mark Ruffalo (Poor Things)
- Colman Domingo (Rustin and The Color Purple) with Jacob Elordi (Priscilla and Saltburn)

Episode 3:

- Michael Fassbender (The Killer) with Carey Mulligan (Maestro)
- Greta Lee (Past Lives) with Andrew Scott (All of Us Strangers)
- Halle Bailey (The Little Mermaid and The Color Purple) with Rachel Zegler (The Hunger Games: The Ballad of Songbirds & Snakes)

Episode 4:

- Emily Blunt (Oppenheimer) with Anne Hathaway (Eileen)
- Taraji P. Henson (The Color Purple) with Jeffrey Wright (American Fiction)
- Paul Mescal (All of Us Strangers) with Natalie Portman (May December)

=== Season 20 (2024) ===
Episode 1:

- Robert Downey Jr. (The Sympathizer) with Jodie Foster (True Detective: Night Country)
- Anthony Mackie (Twisted Metal) with Tyler James Williams (Abbott Elementary)
- Emma Corrin (A Murder at the End of the World) with Elizabeth Debicki (The Crown)

Episode 2:

- Jon Hamm (Fargo and The Morning Show) with Kristen Wiig (Palm Royale)
- Kim Kardashian (American Horror Story: Delicate) with Chloë Sevigny (Feud: Capote vs.The Swans)
- Joey King (We Were the Lucky Ones) with Taylor Zakhar Perez (Red, White & Royal Blue)

Episode 3:

- Jennifer Aniston (The Morning Show) with Quinta Brunson (Abbott Elementary)
- Nicholas Galitzine (Mary & George and Red, White & Royal Blue) with Leo Woodall (One Day)
- Jonathan Bailey (Fellow Travelers) with Naomi Watts (Feud: Capote vs. The Swans)

Episode 4:

- Brie Larson (Lessons in Chemistry) with Andrew Scott (Ripley)
- Hannah Einbinder (Hacks) with Chloe Fineman (Saturday Night Live)
- Tom Hiddleston (Loki) with Anna Sawai (Shōgun)

=== Season 21 (2025) ===
Episode 1:

- Andrew Garfield (We Live in Time) with Ryan Reynolds (Deadpool & Wolverine)
- Amy Adams (Nightbitch) with Demi Moore (The Substance)
- Zendaya (Challengers, Dune: Part Two) with Nicole Kidman (Babygirl)

Episode 2:

- Ariana Grande (Wicked) with Paul Mescal (Gladiator II)
- Kieran Culkin (A Real Pain) with Colman Domingo (Sing Sing)
- Selena Gomez (Emilia Pérez) & Saoirse Ronan (Blitz, The Outrun)

Episode 3:

- Daniel Craig (Queer) with Josh O'Connor (Challengers)
- Zoe Saldaña (Emilia Pérez) with Kate Winslet (Lee)
- Cynthia Erivo (Wicked) with Angelina Jolie (Maria)

Episode 4:

- Pamela Anderson (The Last Showgirl) with Mikey Madison (Anora)
- Harris Dickinson (Babygirl) with Drew Starkey (Queer)
- Adrien Brody (The Brutalist) with Tilda Swinton (The Room Next Door)

=== Season 22 (2025) ===
Episode 1:

- Arnold Schwarzenegger (Secret Level) with Patrick Schwarzenegger (The White Lotus)
- Seth Rogen (The Studio) with Jason Segel (Shrinking)

Episode 2:

- Sterling K. Brown (Paradise) with Natasha Rothwell (How to Die Alone, The White Lotus)
- Kathryn Hahn (Agatha All Along, The Studio) with Kate Hudson (Running Point)
- Kathy Bates (Matlock) with Billy Bob Thornton (Landman)

Episode 3:

- Javier Bardem (Monsters: The Lyle and Erik Menendez Story) with Diego Luna (La Máquina, Andor)
- Kristen Bell (Nobody Wants This) with Adam Scott (Severance)
- Lisa Kudrow (No Good Deed) with Parker Posey (The White Lotus)

Episode 4:

- Danny DeVito (It's Always Sunny in Philadelphia) with Colin Farrell (The Penguin)
- Keri Russell (The Diplomat) with Scott Speedman (Grey's Anatomy)
- Charlie Cox (Adults, Daredevil: Born Again) with Joe Locke (Agatha All Along, Heartstopper)

=== Season 23 (2025) ===
- Adam Sandler (Jay Kelly) and Ariana Grande (Wicked: For Good)
- Dwayne Johnson (The Smashing Machine) and Brendan Fraser (Rental Family)
- David Corenswet (Superman) and Jonathan Bailey (Wicked: For Good)
- Michael B. Jordan (Sinners) and Jesse Plemons (Bugonia)
- Julia Roberts (After the Hunt) and Sean Penn (One Battle After Another)
- Cynthia Erivo (Wicked: For Good) and Hugh Jackman (Song Sung Blue)
- Kate Hudson (Song Sung Blue) and Jeremy Allen White (Springsteen: Deliver Me From Nowhere)
- Gwyneth Paltrow (Marty Supreme) and Jacob Elordi (Frankenstein)
- Stellan Skarsgård (Sentimental Value) and Alexander Skarsgård (Pillion)
- Sydney Sweeney (Christy) and Ethan Hawke (Blue Moon)
- Oscar Isaac (Frankenstein) and Teyana Taylor (One Battle After Another)
- Jennifer Lawrence (Die My Love) and Leonardo DiCaprio (One Battle After Another)
- Colin Farrell (Ballad of a Small Player) and Jessie Buckley (Hamnet)

=== Season 24 (2026) ===
- Jennifer Aniston (The Morning Show) and Lisa Kudrow (The Comeback)
- Keke Palmer (The 'Burbs) and Sharon Stone (Euphoria)
- Kit Harington (Industry) and Peter Dinklage (The Lowdown)
- Kerry Washington (Imperfect Women) and Tony Goldwyn (Hacks, Law & Order)
- Paul Anthony Kelly (Love Story) and Patrick Ball (The Pitt)
- Bowen Yang (Saturday Night Live) and Rachel Sennott (I Love LA)
- Rhea Seehorn (Pluribus) and Bryan Cranston (Malcolm in the Middle: Life's Still Unfair)
- Marcello Hernández (Saturday Night Live) and Tracy Morgan (The Fall and Rise of Reggie Dinkins)
- Josh Hutcherson (I Love LA) and Elizabeth Banks (The Miniature Wife)
- Noah Wyle (The Pitt) and Sally Field (Remarkably Bright Creatures)
- Claire Danes (The Beast in Me) and Richard Gadd (Half Man)
- Colman Domingo (Euphoria, The Four Seasons) and Sarah Pidgeon (Love Story)
- Jamie Lee Curtis (Scarpetta) and Mariska Hargitay (Law & Order: SVU)

== Cast ==
The series is hosted byVariety Chief Awards Editor Clayton Davis and Variety Senior Entertainment Writer Angelique Jackson. Previously hosted by Variety Deputy Awards and Features editor Jenelle Riley, Variety co-editor-in-chief Andrew Wallenstein, Variety New York bureau chief Ramin Setoodeh, and Variety Chief Correspondent Elizabeth Wagmeister.

== Production ==
New episodes are produced twice yearly, once to align with the Academy Awards and once to align with the Emmy Awards.

== Reception ==
The series has been honored with a number of awards, including the 2019 Daytime Emmy Award for Outstanding Special Class Series, and a 2023 Daytime Emmy Nomination for Arts and Popular Culture Program.

=== Awards ===
| Award | Year | Category | Result | Ref. |
|---|---|---|---|---|
| CINE Golden Eagle Awards | 2017 | Golden Eagle | Won | |
| CINE Golden Eagle Awards | 2018 | Golden Eagle | Won | |
| Daytime Emmy Awards | 2019 | Outstanding Special Class Series | Won | |
| Daytime Emmy Awards | 2023 | Outstanding Arts and Popular Culture Program | Nominated | |
| Daytime Emmy Awards | 2024 | Outstanding Arts and Popular Culture Program | Nominated | |
| Daytime Emmy Awards | 2025 | Outstanding Arts and Popular Culture Program | Nominated | |
| Los Angeles Emmy Awards | 2016 | Entertainment Programming | Won | |
| Los Angeles Emmy Awards | 2017 | Entertainment Programming | Nominated | |
| Los Angeles Emmy Awards | 2018 | Arts | Nominated | |
| Telly Awards | 2017 | Branded Content/TV Entertainment Programming | Silver Telly | |
| Telly Awards | 2018 | Entertainment | Bronze Telly | |
| Telly Awards | 2019 | Entertainment | Silver Telly | |
| Webby Awards | 2021 | Video - Entertainment (Video Series & Channels) | Nominated | |

== Spin-off ==
Since 2021, Variety has released Directors on Directors, a companion series to Actors on Actors that airs annually during awards season. It mirrors the original's peer-to-peer conversation format but centers on filmmakers discussing their craft, influences, and storytelling techniques.

In 2025, a Broadway edition of Actors on Actors was introduced ahead of the Tony Awards.
