= Michel Poulain =

Belgian demographer

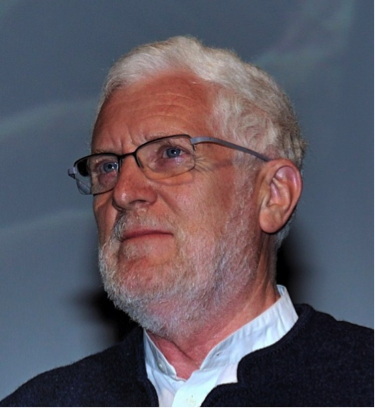
- Born: June 7, 1947 (age 79); Châtelineau, Belgium
- Education: UCLouvain
- Scientific career
- Fields: Demography, longevity

Michel Poulain (7 June 1947, Châtelet, Belgium) was originally trained in astrophysics at University of Liège (ULiège). He received a PhD in demography at University of Louvain (UCLouvain). As a demographer, he has specialized in international Migration Statistics and Longevity studies. Currently emeritus professor at UCLouvain, he is also senior researcher at the Estonian Institute for Population Studies at Tallinn University (Estonia). He has been President of the Société Belge de Démographie (1984-1990) and later of the Association Internationale des Démographes de Langue Française (AIDELF), (1988-2000).

Since 1989, he contributed to the harmonization of international migration statistics at the level of European Union (THESIM) and thereafter worldwide with the International Organization for Migration (IOM). Involved in centenarian’s studies since 1992 he validated the age of numerous supercentenarians including Antonio Todde, Joan Riudavets and Emma Morano, and invalidated the age of Kamato Hongo.

In 2000, he introduced the concept of Blue Zone related to population experiencing exceptionally high longevity and identified with Gianni Pes the first Blue Zone in Sardinia. Thereafter he cooperated with Dan Buettner to investigate additional Blue Zones in Okinawa, Costa Rica and Ikaria (Greece).
