= Nutrisystem =

American weight loss product and service company

Nutrisystem, Inc.
- Type: Subsidiary
- Traded as: Nasdaq: NTRI
- Founded: 1972
- Founder: Harold Katz
- Headquarters: Fort Washington, Pennsylvania, US
- Area served: US and Canada
- Key people: Stephen Mikulak, President
- Products: Weight loss, weight management, nutrition
- Services: Telephone, Internet and mobile counseling for weight control
- Parent: Kainos Capital
- Website: nutrisystem.com

Nutrisystem is a commercial provider of weight loss products and services headquartered in Fort Washington, Pennsylvania.

== Company history ==
Nutrisystem's initial product in 1972 was a liquid protein diet, but the company changed its offering after Slim-Fast came to prominence in that market. In 1993, Nutrisystem filed for Chapter 11 bankruptcy as it owed $44 million to lenders. The company laid off 1,800 employees that year.

The company originally offered weight loss counseling and products in brick and mortar centers, but in 1999, Nutrisystem moved to a direct-to-consumer business model, selling its products and programs on the Internet and by telephone.

The company launched its mobile platform in 2010. WebDiet, Inc., a Silicon Valley startup, accused Nutrisystem of stealing their technology, but the case was dismissed in May, 2014.

In 2015, the firm acquired the South Beach Diet brand.

In December 2018, Tivity Health announced that it would acquire the Nutrisystem brand.

On October 19, 2020, Kainos Capital acquired the brand from Tivity Health.

In 2021, Stephen Mikulak was named President of Nutrisystem.

The company is known for its celebrity marketing, which has included Marie Osmond in national advertising. One of its primary competitors is Weight Watchers with the rivalry deemed "diet wars" by the media.

== Efficacy and criticism ==
A systematic review in 2015 concluded that Nutrisystem "shows promise" because, in the short term, studies have shown that Nutrisystem was more effective at weight-loss than a control group, but found no studies of long-term efficacy.

As of 2019, four weeks of a basic Nutrisystem plan costs the average American customer $274.99. In light of this expense, the Mayo Clinic lists one of the disadvantages of the diet to be its potentially "prohibitive" cost. Obesity specialist Fatima Cody Stanford writes that a potential disadvantage of the diet is that it complicates social eating because a person following the Nutrisystem plan has to follow a distinct dietary program.
