= Jenelle Riley =

American screenwriter

- Born: Jenelle Lynn Riley; September 26, 1982 (age 44); Salem, Oregon, U.S.
- Occupations: Screenwriter, journalist, editor

Jenelle Lynn Riley (born September 26, 1982) is an American screenwriter, actress, host, journalist, and producer. Riley wrote the 2015 short film Warning Labels, directed by Jennifer Morrison, and was the original host of Variety's Actors on Actors, for which she has won a Daytime Emmy Award and two Los Angeles Emmy Awards. She was also an editor for Variety and contributor to The Huffington Post. She wrote and directed the award-winning play "A Kind of Love Story" which had its world premiere at Sacred Fools Theater Company in Los Angeles. She is the regular host of career conversations for the SAG-AFTRA Foundation, where she has conducted lengthy interviews with various actors.

== Theater career ==
Riley's first play, "Just Julie," was published when she was a teenager. Her play "Heart Murmurs and Brain Matter" premiered in 2000 in Los Angeles before being staged in London and New York. She followed that with the highly acclaimed "Comfortably Numb" in 2001. Other works include "The Gemini Project," "Duct Tape and Dreams" and "Unholy Matrimony." In 2012, the world premiere of "A Kind of Love Story" took place at Sacred Fools Theatre in Hollywood, earning six L.A. Weekly Award nominations and winning a directing prize for Riley. The play has been published by Stage Rights. In 2017, she wrote and directed "Jane Austen's Emma Frankenstein," also at Sacred Fools.

== Filmography ==
Year	Title	Role	Notes
2003	Auditions	Writer and Bad Auditioner	
2004	The Perfect Candidate	Writer	
2004	Crazy Love	Writer	Winner: Palm Springs Shortsfest
2004	An Inconvenient Affair	Writer	
2004	The B.P.R.D. Declassified	Student	Television film
2005	The Swap	Writer	
2005–present	SAG Foundation Conversations	Host	300 episodes
2007	Manband the Movie	Office Worker	
2012	A Girl, a Guy, a Space Helmet	Radio Host	
2013	American Hustle	Neighbor	(Deleted Scenes Only)
2014	Firsts	Writer	Episode: "The Threesome"
2014–2019	Actors on Actors	Host/Producer	Emmy Award Winner
2015	Nobody's Perfect	Maya	Short film
2015	Joy	Special Thanks	
2015	Warning Labels	Writer	Short film
2015	Grand Gestures	Writer and Director	Short film
2019	Butter Emails	Writer	Short film
2026	My Ex-Life	Writer	
