= AARP/Blue Zones Vitality Project =

Health program in Albert Lea, Minnesota

The AARP/Blue Zones Vitality Project is an initiative aimed at improving well-being that began in January 2009 when the city of Albert Lea, Minnesota, launched the initiative with assistance from the United Health Foundation and led by Dan Buettner, author of "The Blue Zones: Lessons for Living Longer From the People Who've Lived the Longest."

== Vitality Project Initiatives ==
Initiatives within the Vitality Project were divided into categories such as habitat, social networking, community, and purpose. Some initiatives were specific to one category while others spanned several categories.

- Walking Moai Program: Over 500 participants formed approximately 70 "walking moais," groups of 4-10 walkers meeting weekly to walk to a set destination and back. They collectively walked over 75 million steps and engaged in over 2,200 hours of volunteer work.
- Walking School Bus: This program enlisted parents and volunteers to walk groups of children to elementary schools, promoting walking, building social networks, and enhancing safety.
- Vitality Compass: An online tool assessing participants' habits and providing an approximate life expectancy. Participants took the survey at the beginning and end of the program, with the average life expectancy increasing by three years.
- Volunteering: Participants were encouraged to volunteer in their community.
- Employers: Employers were encouraged to make their work environments more amenable to practices leading to good health. For example, some employers added healthy alternatives to vending machines.
- Grocery Stores: Grocery stores encouraged to feature foods thought to engender better health and increased life expectancy.
- Neighborhood Picnics: To encourage community building and social networking, several neighborhood picnics were held, and everyone in a given neighborhood were invited to attend.
- Community Gardens: Space made available for citizens of Albert Lea to plant vegetables and flowers, promoting urban gardening.
- Purpose Workshops: Free workshops focused on helping individuals find their sense of purpose, led by recognized experts.

== Walkability ==
Early in the Vitality Project, organizers invited Dan Burden to come speak to community leaders and do a "walkability audit". In this audit, Burden toured Albert Lea on foot and pointed out ways that the city could make Albert Lea more walkable. Since then, the city has added a sidewalk which connects several portions of a well-traveled path around Fountain Lake.

== Sustainability ==
The city also established a sustainability committee focused on maintaining implemented practices. Their goal is that Albert Lea will have a Vitality Center where leaders of other cities, organizations, and individuals can learn about how making small changes in lifestyle as a community can help improve health and life expectancy.

On October 26, 2009, the Albert Lea City Council voted to designate the lower level of the Jacobson Apartment Building on Broadway Avenue in downtown Albert Lea as the Vitality Center. The space was refurbished and updated to accommodate the Vitality Center. The city's goal was for the Vitality Center be opened in the first part of 2010.

== Media coverage ==
The Vitality Project was featured in a variety of news outlets and publications. Among them are Good Morning America, USA Today, Minneapolis Star Tribune, and Minnesota Public Radio.

The initiative collaborated with Healthways and expanded to the LA beach cities - Hermosa, Redondo, and Manhattan Beach. In Iowa, a statewide initiative was implemented.

== See also ==
- Longevity
