= Zoë François =

American celebrity chef, author, blogger

Zoë François is an American pastry chef, author, and television personality, notable for her show and various appearances on the Magnolia Network and several cookbooks, including the popular "Bread In 5" series co-authored by Jeff Hertzeberg.

== Career ==
Zoë François started a dessert cart business, Zoë’s Cookies in a semester off from The University of Vermont, based on "a fictitious business plan" written in "a stultifyingly dull business class". After college she moved to Minneapolis and worked in advertising and catering, before she decided to go to culinary school. She went to the Culinary Institute of America in New York and before graduating she secured as an assistant pastry chef for celebrity chef Andrew Zimmern. François became the Executive Pastry Chef at Zimmern's restaurant Bravo, and then the Executive Pastry Chef for Steven Brown's restaurants.

After her second child, François left her work in restaurants, stating that the long hours were "not conducive to family life,". This decision led to her publishing success, as she met her future collaborator Jeff Hertzberg at music classes for children (both had students enrolled). In 2007 the two co-authored Artisan Bread in Five Minutes a Day, which received wide acclaim and became a national bestselling series. The same year, she launched her blog, Zoe Bakes.

By 2012 she expanded her reach from the Zoe Bakes blog by creating an Instagram account of the same name. In both online spaces, she produces video and recipe content. In 2020 her video content on Instagram expanded to livestreams.

She published her first solo book, Zoë Bakes Cakes in March 2021, and it was the recipient of the IACP Award for Best Baking Book the following year. She subsequently published Zoë Bakes Cookies, which became a 2024 New York Times Bestseller.

Her TV show "Zoë Bakes" was part of the inaugural programming lineup of the Magnolia Network, which launched in July 2021. The show ran for three seasons and concluded in 2022, focusing on François' local relationships in and culinary treasures of Minneapolis. François also co-hosted a special in 2024 called "Holiday Party with Andrew and Zoë", for which she and her co-host were nominated for the 2024 Daytime Emmy Award for Daytime Personality - Non-Daily. François has also been a guest judge on "Big Time Bake" and "Chopped Sweets".

== Early life ==
Born in 1967 in New Britain, Connecticut, François grew up on "a commune in Vermont". She attributes her love of dessert to "food-based rebellion" from this time. Her first job in the food and beverage industry was creating ice cream cakes at Ben and Jerry's.

== Works ==
- Zoë Bakes Cookies: Everything You Need to Know to Make Your Favorite Cookies and Bars (2024)
- Zoë Bakes Cakes: Everything You Need to Know to Make Your Favorite Layers, Bundts, Loaves, and More (2021)
- Five Minute Bread: The revolutionary new baking method: no bread machine, no kneading! (2011).

=== Co-authored with Jeff Hertzberg ===
- The Best of Artisan Bread in Five Minutes a Day: Favorite Recipes from BreadIn5 (2021)*
- Holiday and Celebration Bread in Five Minutes a Day: Sweet and Decadent Baking for Every Occasion (2018)*
- The New Healthy BRead in Five Minutes a Day: Revised and Updated with New Recipes (2016)*
- Gluten-Free Artisan Bread in Five Minutes a Day: The Baking Revolution Continues with 90 New, Delicious and Easy Recipes Made with Gluten-Free Flours (2014)*
- The New Artisan Bread in Five Minutes a Day: The Discovery That Revolutionizes Home Baking (2013)*
- Artisan Pizza and Flatbread in Five Minutes a Day: The Homemade Bread Revolution Continues (2011)*
- Healthy Bread in Five Minutes a Day: 100 New Recipes Featuring Whole Grains, Fruits, Vegetables, and Gluten-Free Ingredients (2009)*
- Artisan Bread in Five Minutes a Day: The Discovery That Revolutionizes Home Baking (2007)*
