= The Wizard of Paws =

American reality show for animals

- Starring: Derrick Campana
- Opening theme: "Brand New" by Ben Rector
- Country of origin: United States
- Original language: English
- No. of series: 6
- No. of episodes: 60

Production
- Producer: Erik Christensen
- Running time: 26–28 minutes
- Production companies: BYU TV; The Dodo; Group Nine Media; Nomadica Films

Original release
- Network: BYU TV
- Release: April 2020 – present

The Wizard of Paws is an American reality show on BYU TV that follows Sterling, Virginia-based animal orthotist Derrick Campana as he creates prosthetic limbs for pets and sanctuary animals. The series premiered in April 2020 with a 10-episode first season, followed by six more seasons through 2025. Nat Geo Wild shares the rights to the show, and some episodes are available on Disney+.

Campana attended Pennsylvania State University, where he earned an undergraduate degree in kinesiology and biomechanics in 2001, followed by Northwestern University where he graduated with a master's degree in orthotics and prosthetics. Starting in 2002, Campana worked on human prosthetics for a few years. He currently owns and operates Bionic Pets, specializing in prosthetics, and he remains a partner in Animal OrthoCare, which he founded in 2005 and sold in the 2010s. Campana was first featured on the 2018 Animal Planet show Dodo Heroes.

== Episodes ==
Season	Episodes	Originally released	
Season	Episodes	First released	Last released
1	10	April 8, 2020	June 10, 2020
2	10	April 4, 2021	June 30, 2021
3	10	October 27, 2021	February 2, 2022
4	10	June 11, 2022	August 13, 2022
5	10	April 1, 2023	June 18, 2023
6	10	April 5, 2024	June 8, 2024
7	10	April 10, 2025	June 12, 2025

=== Season 1 (2020) ===
No. overall	No. in season	Title	Original release date	Prod. code
1	1	"Lightning"	April 8, 2020	101
In his studio in Sterling, Virginia, Derrick repairs the wear and tear on active dog Samson's foot prosthetic. In Lexington, North Carolina, six-month-old miniature pony Lightning needs braces to compensate for the weak ligaments that prevent him from standing pain-free.
2	2	"Avery"	April 15, 2020	102
Derrick 3-D prints a leg prosthetic for Waddles the Duck. Avery, a Golden Retriever in Port Orange, Florida, needs partial-limb prosthetics for her back paws which were damaged when she was born.
3	3	"Turbo-Roo & Thor"	April 22, 2020	103
In Plainfield, Indiana, Derrick fits Chihuahua puppies Turbo-Roo and Thor, who have no front legs, with 3D-printed carts.
4	4	"Ferdie"	April 29, 2020	104
In the studio, Derrick builds Jack Russell mix Callie a prosthetic for a missing foot. And a goat named Ferdie in Urbana, Ohio needs a prosthetic for an amputated leg.
5	5	"Bert"	May 6, 2020	105
In the studio, Derrick 3-d prints a jacket for a full-limb prosthetic for Lt. Dan, a rescue dog who lost his leg from buckshot. But his triangle stance causes issues. In Erie, Pennsylvania, Bert the pig suffers from a connective tissue disorder and requires prosthetics on all four legs.
6	6	"Pearl"	May 13, 2020	106
In New York City Pearl, a French Bulldog rescued from a Chinese slaughterhouse, is missing a front paw. Her owner in addition to giving her PT wants to get her a prosthetic. Derrick tries out a new design for her prosthetic and switches a caster for a crutch tip when she proves reluctant to use it. In the studio, Laci, a black lab needs a prosthetic, but Derrick's worried if there's enough elbow left for good attachment and suspension.
7	7	"Elsa"	May 20, 2020	107
In the studio, Rocky the Golden Retriever has a missing front paw. In Orlando, Florida, five-year-old dog Elsa is missing all four of her paws. Her pet parents have been building booties for her daily with bandages and tape. But her stumps are still tender. And Derrick knows getting an animal to accept four devices at once is a longshot.
8	8	"Gracie"	May 27, 2020	108
In the studio, 10 year old Golden Retriever Zoe whose leg was recently amputated for a tumor needs a brace to keeper her good leg from collapsing at the wrist, and a whole-limb prosthetic for the missing leg. In Boston, Derrick builds a partial limb prosthetics for Gracie, a dog missing a back paw, but she's rejected a prosthetic before.
9	9	"Bear"	June 3, 2020	109
In York, Pennsylvania, at the "Here With Us" farm sanctuary, Derrick helps Bear the goat who's missing the bottom half of both his back legs and is handstand walking on his front elbows. He needs six devices: rear leg prosthetics, and bent knee braces to force his rear end down at first, then straight knee prosthetics to eventually straighten the front legs and get him up on all fours and reteach him to walk. So Derrick asks his twin brother Darrell to be an extra pair of hands. For Ziggy's Refuge Farm Sanctuary, Derrick builds prosthetics for 3-week old pig Hanna Montana, with deformed rear legs, and St. Croix sheep Moko whose back legs were lost to frostbite needs new updated braces and prosthetics after surgery.
10	10	"Yusi"	June 10, 2020	110
In a two-part episode, Derrick travels to Paro, Bhutan to visit Baryard Bhutan sanctuary to help them build their own prosthetics workshop. He also builds a prosthetic for Yusi the horse who's nursing a colt but the missing portion of her rear leg is causing her spine to twist out of alignment, but the first design doesn't work.

=== Season 2 (2021) ===
No. overall	No. in season	Title	Original release date	Prod. code
11	1	"Toto"	April 4, 2021	201
Derrick introduces his family and describes how the business has exploded and he's taking the mobile prosthetics unit (and Henry) cross-country. In Lancaster, Pennsylvania he meets with truck driver Elvin to help his 10-year-old canine companion, Toto who lost her front paws in a farm accident two months ago. Toto's still sensitive at her incisions. Derrick creates a clam-shell design to redistribute the weight off the ends of her legs, and decorates her pink prosthetics with butterflies to match the braces Elvin's granddaughter uses. Derrick and the crew also get in some inflatable knocker action.
12	2	"Lacie"	May 5, 2021	202
At High Point, North Carolina, Derrick video calls his family from the world's largest set of dresser drawers. Michael and Linda, dwarf pony Lightning's owners, have asked Derrick for help with their matriarch dog Lacey, whose back end is paralyzed from degenerative disk disease injuring her spine. Derrick sets out to build her a cart, but the full body cast is larger than anything he's done in the mobile lab before. Derrick also adjusts the fit on the four braces that Lightning's brother, Thunder, needs.
13	3	"Aries"	May 12, 2021	203
In Benson, Vermont, Derrick visits the Kinder Way Farm Sanctuary to help Aries, an Icelandic sheep who spends all day on his belly. He has contracted tendons in his front legs, weakness in his back limbs, and has Windswept Syndrome (leans to one side) from a birth defect, so he can't balance in a standard cart. With all four limbs non-functional. Derrick designs his first quad cart. They also ask Derrick to look at Lois, a cow who has contracted tendons in both front legs. He's confident he can build devices that will immediately relieve her pain and help straighten her legs out over time to fix the issue. But Aries has an infection and dies just before the fitting; the family donates the cart componentry. Lois accepts her braces and learns to walk in them.
14	4	"Shadow"	May 19, 2021	204
In Los Angeles, Derrick sightsees in Hollywood before going to help Greg and Jamie with Shadow, an 8-month-old lab/pitbull mix born with front leg deformities who's unable to stand or walk and bounces off her chest/chin to get around. Jamie was also born with a limb difference of the right arm and feels fellowship with Shadow. Derrick expects to build a front limb cart, but he'll have to fit it around her residual limbs. Derrick explains a full body cast is the hardest to make and keep the animal comfortable, but Shadow's completely relaxed. He designs it to use off-road wheels with enough axle width for stability and enough space for residual limb movement. But this makes him mount the componentry farther back than he usually would and he has to adjust angles to get the right height. They go with butterflies for the printed pattern. Jamie wore a passive prosthetic that was painful throughout her childhood but she freed herself from it after graduating high school. But she feels Shadow's prosthetic making a functional difference to improve her quality of life is worth doing despite the love/hate relationship she had with her own. Derrick uses the parts from Aries' cart. Shadow is hesitant, but after Derrick moves her from dirt to pavement, she can walk!
15	5	"Frida"	May 26, 2021	205
In Huntington Beach, California, Derrick meets friends Tara and Lisa and their dog, Frida. On a trip to work at an elephant sanctuary in Thailand, they saw Frida dragging herself through traffic and immediately rescued her. She was missing flesh and bones from her feet and had an infection, and a broken and dislocated back. The lower part of her legs are paralyzed and they now bend backwards; she's walking on her rear knees. She's only comfortable on the soft sand at the beach. Derrick tries to surf. In the consultation, it becomes clear Frida doesn't trust Derrick. He decides to cast the back legs twice and build devices in both her current position to protect her joints and make more surfaces comfortable to walk on as well with the joints in their correct positions. Frida takes swim therapy. Derrick fits the comfortable braces first and she takes off running and playing with Henry. He thinks it would be a miracle if the ideal position braces work, but tries them anyway. And Frida quickly takes to them and walks in normal posture. Derrick is amazed. And now Frida trusts Derrick.
16	6	"Zoey"	June 2, 2021	206
In Alliance, Ohio, Derrick fails an ice cream eating challenge at Almost Heaven before heading to Canton, Ohio to treat Zoey. Zoey is an 8-month old golden retriever who lost the front right paw in an accident at birth. Owner Cindy previously had a three-legged golden retriever named Wrigley and she knows how his life was shortened and his pain increased by not having a prosthesis. And having had a leg amputated, herself, from osteosarcoma at 14, Cindy's well aware of the benefits—and difficulties—of using one. Derek geeks out over Cindy's leg before designing Zoey a prosthesis that's adjustable in height and angle since she's still a puppy and not fully grown. Cindy is also an amputee mentor and wants Zoey to be a therapy dog to help her support new amputees adjusting to a first prosthesis. Derrick uses the same componentry for Zoey's device that Cindy's has. Zoey panics and doesn't take to the prosthetic immediately, but she gradually begins to touch/tap, and Cindy knows it's a process that takes time. She's also glad that the story of Zoey having to work and learn to use the leg will be a good one for her mentees to hear.
17	7	"Trigger"	June 9, 2021	207
Trigger is a pig in Providence, North Carolina with disabled back legs.
18	8	"Menina"	June 16, 2021	208
At Magical Creatures Sanctuary, an animal sanctuary in Laupāhoehoe, Hawaii, the young sheep Menina was born with deformities in her front legs. Derrick attempts to build prosthetic legs for her.
19	9	"Gaia"	June 23, 2021	209
Derrick visits Aloha Animal Sanctuary and meets a sheep named Gaia. Gaia has overcome abuse and neglect, but she needs a prosthetic leg to keep up with her lamb, Felicio.
20	10	"Hope"	June 30, 2021	210
Derrick travels to Utah and makes a leg prosthesis for a goat named Hope. He mentors Hope’s owner, Gentry, throughout the prosthetic-making process.

=== Season 3 (2021) ===
No. overall	No. in season	Title	Original release date	Prod. code
21	1	"Boots"	October 27, 2021	301
22	2	"Teo"	October 27, 2021	302
23	3	"Colby"	November 3, 2021	303
24	4	"Penny"	November 17, 2021	304
25	5	"Debbie"	November 24, 2021	305
26	6	"Penelopes"	January 5, 2022	306
27	7	"Marvel"	January 12, 2022	307
28	8	"Gunner"	January 19, 2022	308
29	9	"Jerry Lee"	January 26, 2022	309
30	10	"Indy"	February 2, 2022	310

=== Season 4 (2022) ===
No. overall	No. in season	Title	Original release date	Prod. code
31	1	"Ski Pawtrol"	June 11, 2022	401
32	2	"Raccoon-ing and Rolling"	June 18, 2022	402
33	3	"Mission: Im-paw-sible"	June 25, 2022	403
34	4	"Sweet Peaches"	July 2, 2022	404
35	5	"Marvelous Millie"	July 9, 2022	405
36	6	"Rolling in the Sheep"	July 16, 2022	406
37	7	"We Love Roo"	July 23, 2022	407
38	8	"A Moe-ment Like This"	July 30, 2022	408
39	9	"Kala Me Mine"	August 6, 2022	409
40	10	"Love & Elephants"	August 13, 2022	410
In a three-part season finale, Derrick travels to Thailand to fit elephants Mai Mai and Khun Dej and a bull named Mr. Cow with the braces and prosthetics he's been built for them.

=== Season 5 (2023) ===
No. overall	No. in season	Title	Original release date
41	1	"Sister, Sister"	March 31, 2023
In Raleigh, North Carolina, Derrick helps Kaitlyn surprise her sister Kamryn by creating a full-limb prosthetic for Kamryn’s dog Amiri after he lost his leg in a golf cart accident.
42	2	"The Karate Dog"	April 22, 2022
Derrick travels to California to meet Martin and Jesse Kove, stars of the “Cobra Kai” franchise, and help create a full-limb prosthetic for their 3-legged dog, Bubba.
43	3	"Saving Amelia"	April 22, 2023
At an animal sanctuary in Renton, Washington, Derrick builds a brace for Amelia, a cow with birth defects. He adds height to her shortened back leg to fix her triangle stance and hopefully extend her life.
44	4	"Two Peas in a Pod"	April 22, 2023
In Ontario, Canada, Derrick meets best friends Winnie, a two-year-old 'kangaroo' dog with front limb deformities, and Chip, a six-month-old sheep. Derrick builds them both custom carts. Chips takes to the cart immediately, but Winnie...does not.
45	5	"This Little Piggy Wants Wheels"	April 22, 2023
In Deltona, Florida, Derrick brings hope to a mother and daughter as he crafts a custom cart for their potbelly pig named Valentine. In the studio, Derrick builds pitbull cancer survivor, Emily Rose, a full-limb prosthetic.
46	6	"Super Cow"	April 29, 2023
The Safe in Austin rescue in Texas needs help lifting their quadriplegic cow, Champion, off the ground without making him uncomfortable. Unable to make a whole body cast of such a large animal, Derrick must call on the expertise of friends to help him build a new and better-fitting lift to fly a cow.
47	7	"Ready, Set, Hanabi!"	May 6, 2023
At Nolin River Wildlife Sanctuary, Derrick builds a cart for Morrison, Boone's buddy, another raccoon with cerebellar hypoplasia. In Louisville, Kentucky, Derrick builds front-feet prostheses for pitbull Hanabi who lost her feet at birth, with a little help from her human brothers who want to lose a footrace to her.
48	8	"Story's Magic Leg"	May 13, 2023
In San Francisco, Derrick helps out a family with a one year old German Shepherd whose left rear foot was severed. Her residual limb is still tender and sensitive and makes walking painful. Derrick hopes he can make the prosthetic comfortable enough that she won't reject it.
49	9	"Boundless Birdie"	May 20, 2023
In the studio, Derek builds a prosthetic for a five-month old Flemish Giant rabbit, Diego, whose broken foot healed without medical care into a permanently curved limb. In Wayne, Illinois, Derrick has to build a full-limb prosthetic for a 10-year old tripod dog, Birdie. But since she had to have the leg amputated shortly after birth, she's never been on four legs before.
50	10	"Derrick vs. LA (Part 1)"	May 27, 2023
Derrick sets up a pop-up in LA and begins interviewing potential clients.
51	11	"Derrick vs. LA (Part 2)"	June 3, 2023
Derrick struggles to finish the mammoth task of making 13 devices in three days, with only his mobile lab.

=== Season 6 (2024) ===
No. overall	No. in season	Title	Original release date	Prod. code
52	1	"The Happiest Fox"	April 5, 2024	TBA
In Monticello, Florida, Derrick visits the Juniper Wildlife Rescue, run by Zach and Jess, to help a fox named Fig. Fig was born with a missing foot but used the shortened leg like a crutch. Unfortunately, a break in the leg required partial amputation and now it's too short to be used as a support, and remaining ankle is collapsing. Fig is Derrick's first fox, so he must study the other foxes at the sanctuary to gauge the correct angles for the brace he'll build to help the remaining leg. When fitted, Fig panics at first, but quickly adapts to the brace.
53	2	"Ollie, Ollie, Running Free!"	April 13, 2024	TBA
In Elkton, Maryland, Derrick stops at an apple butter festival before going to help the Sotnik family's Corgi, Ollie, born with split-paw ectrodactyly. The shorter legs and lack of a pronounced elbow to anchor a prosthetic on his first Corgi patient worry Derrick. He gifts the family with six hydrotherapy sessions for Ollie, something they couldn't afford. Ollie adjusts well and even runs in his new prosthetic.
54	3	"Agatha, the G.O.A.T. Goat"	April 20, 2024	TBA
In Fort Collins, Colorado, at Broken Shovels Farm Sanctuary, Agatha is a year and a half old goat with malformed back legs who handstands vertically on her front legs. Derrick needs to design a unique (tie-dye) cart to support her, but also allows her to adjust angle to what's comfortable. The first build's straps need to be redone before Agatha accepts the cart.
55	4	"Ivy the Miracle Cow"	April 27, 2024	TBA
Derrick travels to Montrose, Colorado to help Ivy, a miniature cow with front limb deformities.
56	5	"Layka, An American Hero"	May 4, 2024	TBA
57	6	"Loretta the Miniature Zebu"	May 11, 2024	TBA
58	7	"Second Chances for Lenny"	May 18, 2024	TBA
59	8	"A Buddy for Jojo Tidd"	May 25, 2024	TBA
60	9	"Miracle in Honduras (Part 1)"	June 1, 2024	TBA
61	10	"Miracle in Honduras (Part 2)"	June 8, 2024	TBA

=== Season 7 (2025) ===
No. overall	No. in season	Title	Original release date	Prod. code
62	1	"A New Chance"	April 10, 2025	TBA
Derrick goes to Kentucky to help Chance, a tripod therapy dog who helps patients at Shriners Hospital for Children. Chance is big and his joints are wearing down. Derrick has to bring all his skills to bear to keep Chance in good form for the future.
63	2	"Scooter & Bella"	April 17, 2025	TBA
Derrick visits Aimee's Animal Sanctuary to help two disabled goats: Scotter, born paralyzed and Bella, missing a leg; with help from Amy and volunteer Colette, he hopes to get them out playing and grazing with the herd, finally free to roam together.
64	3	"Buddy the Chihuahua"	April 24, 2025	TBA
Derrick visits Minnesota to help Buddy, a thirteen-year-old tripod Chihuaha; Buddy's parents are first responders who depend on his unconditional love to help them manage stress; Buddy has lost a leg and they are hoping Derrick can help.
65	4	"Saint Goes Marching In"	May 1, 2025	TBA
66	5	"Loni's Leg Up"	May 8, 2025	TBA
67	6	"Pop-Up in Sydney"	May 15, 2025	TBA
68	7	"Buster's New Kicks"	May 22, 2025	TBA
69	8	"Atticus Finch's New Leg"	May 29, 2024	TBA
70	9	"The Wizard of Claws"	June 5, 2025	TBA
71	10	"Frodo of the Backwater"	June 12, 2025	TBA
