= Blue zone =

Region with claims of unusual longevity

The blue zone theory represents a region where some people self-attest to exceptional longevity, which has been variously attributed to lifestyle. Favorable factors under research may be physical activity, low stress, frequent social interactions, a predominantly plant-based diet, and low disease incidence. The name blue zones derived simply during the original survey by scientists, who "used a blue pen on a map to mark the villages with long-lived population." Suggested blue zones include Okinawa Prefecture in Japan, Nuoro Province and Bolotana in Sardinia, Italy, the Nicoya Peninsula in Costa Rica, and Icaria, Greece.

Based on an absence of scientific evidence, the concept of blue zones is commonly challenged as unproven. Subsequent research contradicted initial claims, such as for Okinawa, which experienced substantial decline in life expectancy during the 21st century, and Nicoya, where people born after 1930 did not have exceptional longevity compared to the broader national population.

== History ==
A 1999 study of elderly people living on Sardinia found a prevalence of 13 centenarians per 100,000 population, which would indicate unusual longevity, if true. A 2004 followup report showed that longevity was concentrated in the Nuoro Province of Sardinia, specifically in its mountain regions where locally born men supposedly lived longer than those in the rest of Sardinia, although no reasons for the apparent longevity were known.

Beginning in 2005, the list of blue zone regions was extended from Sardinia to include Okinawa, Nicoya in Costa Rica, and Icaria in Greece. Michel Poulain added Martinique as a possible blue zone in 2019, while Loma Linda, California and Singapore were discussed as possibilities later.

=== Estimating population longevity ===
In the original study of centenarians living in 14 mountain villages of Sardinia (the first proposed blue zone), the research team developed an Extreme Longevity Index (ELI) representing the ratio between the number of eventual centenarians born between 1880 and 1900, and the total number of births recorded during the same time interval for the region. The ELI was defined as the number of centenarians per 10,000 newborns, and was used to determine the probability that any person born in that municipality would reach 100 years old while remaining mentally and physically functional.

Another longevity index applied was the Centenarian rate (CR) for the 1900 birth group (number of persons surviving to 100 years old per 10,000 people alive at age 60) in December 2000. The Sardinia and Okinawa blue zones had CR values for men substantially higher compared to several other countries, whereas values for women were mostly above those in other countries, while comparable to others.

Several possible errors or limitations exist for these estimates, such as failure to validate accuracy of ages, unreliable interviews or missing birth records.

=== Research ===
A 2025 assessment of long-lived populations in Sardinia, Okinawa, Ikaria, and Nicoya cross-checked civil birth and death records, church archives, and genealogical records to minimize false-age claims and rely on population-level survival patterns rather than surveys of individuals recalling from memory. While the study acknowledged that modernization can cause longevity patterns to shift or disappear, it proposed that these regions may serve as "natural laboratories" for understanding how geographic isolation, lifestyle, diet, and social connectivity are possible factors for healthy aging.

A 2025 review of the same four blue zones used a three-step method to qualify a long-life zone: strict age validation to confirm longevity; demographic indicators to identify population longevity; and longevity criteria proving a significant number of individuals with at least 50% longer lives than the national average. Possible longevity factors found in this study were diet, physical activity, social support, and environment.

Further research specifically on the Okinawa population revealed two generations with contrasting longevity: people born before World War II had many centenarians, whereas those born after 1945 had no evidence for longevity, but rather with mortality at younger ages than for elderly people in most Japan regions.

=== Commercialization of Blue Zones LLC ===
After the concept of blue zones was introduced by Dan Buettner in 2005, the commercial enterprise, Blue Zones LLC, was formed in 2008 to "launch Blue Zone projects in several communities across the United States to promote the lifestyle principles." Adventist Health acquired Blue Zones LLC in 2020, and in 2024, Blue Zones LLC announced a partnership with The American College of Lifestyle Medicine.

== Critiques ==
In a 2025 review, the authors stated that Loma Linda was included in blue zones marketing after editors requested an example from the United States. However, the authors stated that "the longevity in Loma Linda cannot be measured by using the same methodology." They also argue that "the extraordinary longevity observed in Okinawa is still a matter of debate. The original Koseki [family register] was largely destroyed during the Battle of Okinawa in 1945 and was later reconstructed by American authorities. This has led to debates about the reliability of Okinawan longevity claims, as errors may have occurred during the reconstruction process after World War II."

A 2024 review challenged the concept of blue zone communities having exceptional longevity, arguing that there is an absence of scientific evidence relating community lifestyle to longevity. The review also stated that the blue zone concept spurred a profitable business empire that produced "books, diets, a multimillion-dollar company, and a Netflix series—all aimed at imparting at least some of those secrets to an eager audience."

Costa Rica's inclusion as a blue zone appears to be transient and no longer applicable, as of 2023.

A 2021 review stated that there are no controlled studies of elderly people in the blue zones, and that blue zone diets are based on speculation, having no evidence obtained through a rigorous scientific method.

== See also ==
- AARP/Blue Zones Vitality Project
- Alameda County Study
- Centenarian
- Gerontology Research Group
- Research into centenarians
- Supercentenarian
