= Tivity Health =

American healthcare company

- Industry: Health care
- Founded: 1981
- Headquarters: Franklin, Tennessee, United States
- Area served: United States
- Key people: Hill Ferguson (President & Chief Executive Officer)
- Services: Fitness, nutrition
- Number of employees: 500+ (2023)

Tivity Health is an administrator of fitness and wellness services. Tivity Health is headquartered in Franklin, Tennessee and has campuses in Franklin, Tennessee and Chandler, Arizona. The company was founded in 1981 as American Healthways and rebranded to Tivity Health in 2017. Tivity Health acquired Nutrisystem Inc., which included the South Beach Diet brand, in March 2019, and sold the nutrition business to Kainos Capital in October 2020.

== History ==
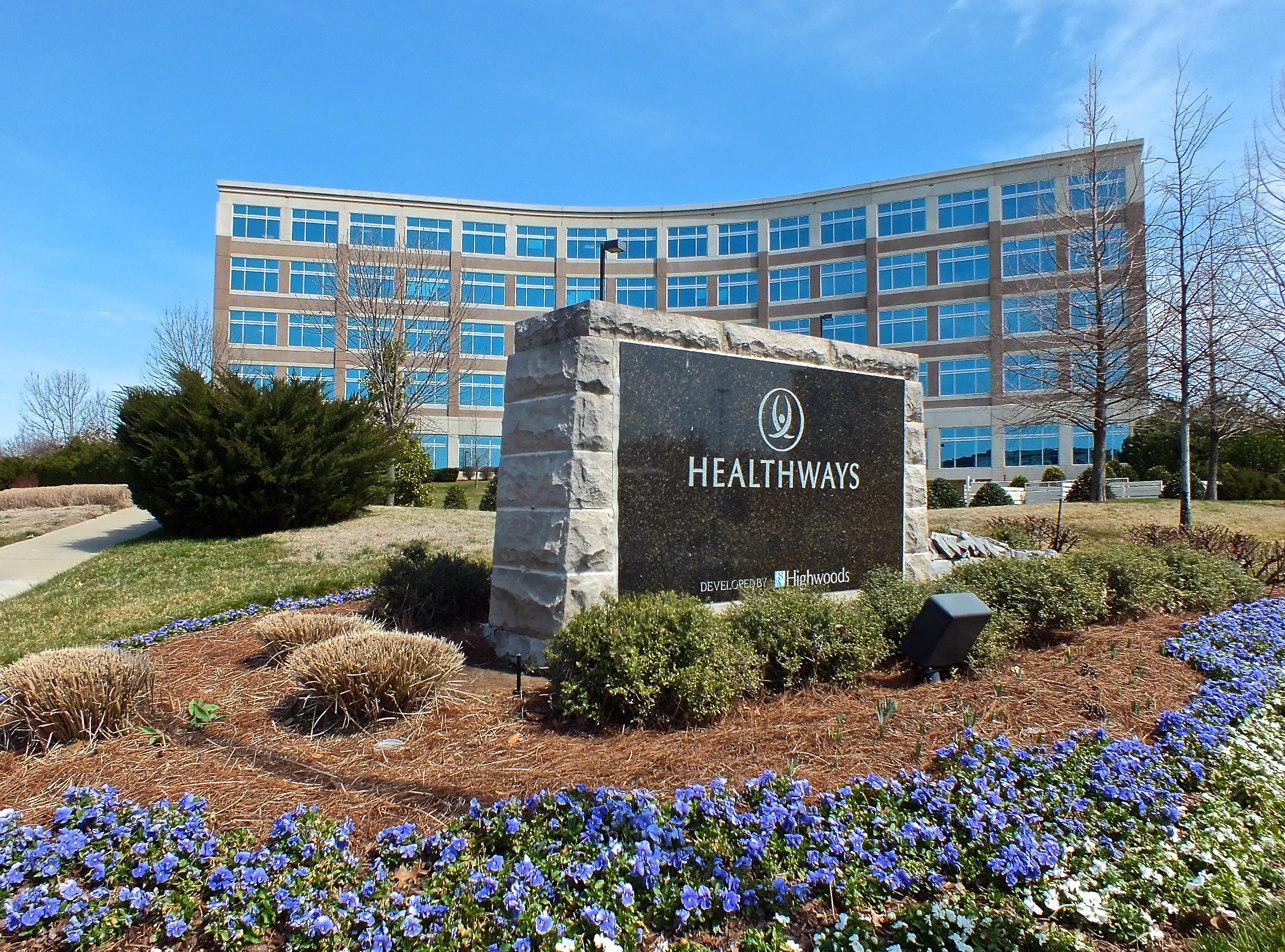
When Tivity Health was known as Healthways, its headquarters was in the Cool Springs area of Franklin, Tennessee.

- 1981: The company was founded as American Healthways.
- 2003: The company's name changed from American Healthways to Healthways.
- 2006: Healthways acquired Axia Health Management, which had both SilverSneakers and QuitNet, a company that spun-out of Boston University as a for-profit entity in 2000, in its portfolio.
- 2009: Healthways acquired HealthHonors, a behavior economics company that specializes in behavior change science and use of incentives.
- 2010: Blue Zones and Healthways teamed up to create, support, and sustain a national movement to improve community health and well-being.
- 2011: Healthways acquired Navvis & Company.
- 2013: Healthways and The Lampo Group, Inc. entered into an exclusive agreement for Healthways to deliver the CORE Financial Wellness program as part of its Well-Being Improvement Solution.
- 2013: Healthways contracted with Dean Ornish to operate and license his Lifestyle Management Programs.
- 2011: Hedge fund North Tide Capital started to invest in Healthways.
- 2013 December: North Tide Capital bought additional shares in Healthways. They proposed four new board members.
- 2014 February: CEO and founder Thomas Cigarran resigned.
- 2014 early: Following a board shuffle that included appointing North Tide's CEO and founder to the board of directors, Healthways engaged J. P. Morgan Securities as advisor.
- 2014: Healthways operated eight "Well-Being Improvement Centers" (WBICs) across the US, and three international facilities.
- 2016: Healthways divested its subsidiary MeYou Health.
- 2016: Healthways sold its brand name and a large portion of its business to Sharecare.
- 2017: Healthways rebranded to Tivity Health.
- 2019 December: Tivity Health announced plans to acquire Nutrisystem, Inc. (including the South Beach Diet brand, which Nutrisystem had acquired in 2015). Nutrisystem's CEO Dawn Zier was named president and COO of Tivity health after the merger. Zier stepped down from this position.
- 2020 February: Tivity Health announced the departure of Donato J. Tramuto as CEO and his resignation from the board. The company appointed current director Robert J. Greczyn, Jr. as interim CEO while it conducts a search for a new CEO.
- 2020 May: Tivity Health appointed Richard Ashworth as President and CEO, effective June 1, 2020.
- 2020 October: Tivity Health announced that it had agreed to sell the Nutrisystem business to Kainos Capital.
- 2022 April: Tivity Health announced it had been acquired by the private equity company, Stone Point Capital, for US$2 billion in cash. This was finished in June, 2022.
- 2023 January: Tivity Health acquires digital health and wellness platform Burnalong
- 2023 July: Tivity Health Appoints Hill Ferguson as President and CEO
- 2024 December: Tivity Health Appoints Caroline Khalil and Natasha Deckmann as Presidents

== Services ==
- SilverSneakers
- Prime Fitness
- WholeHealth Living
- Burnalong
