= Jamila Norman =

American urban farmer and television personality

Jamila Norman is a first generation American, born in New York to Caribbean parents. She grew up in Queens, New York, then eventually moved, with her family, to Connecticut, and finally to Georgia. Her mother grew up on a family farm in Jamaica, and her father is from Trinidad. She earned a bachelor's degree in Environmental Engineering from the University of Georgia. She is a mother and currently lives in Atlanta, Georgia.

== Media work ==
Jamila Norman stars on the show Homegrown on Chip and Joanna Gaines' Magnolia Network. On Homegrown, Norman explains and shows the audience her life as an urban farmer at her own farm. The show also depicts ways in which urban farming can develop more sustainable food systems in communities and cities that face discriminatory and oppressed living and eating conditions.

== Agriculture work ==
Norman co-founded, with Chef Beee, Patchwork City Farms, a 1.2 acre urban farm in Atlanta, Georgia, in 2010. The farm produces organic foods: fruits, vegetables, and herbs for local Atlanta farmer's markets and restaurants. The farm was established on land leased from a public school. Norman then bought land in 2016, and moved Patchwork City Farms to the new location. Norman's work focuses on implementing sustainable food systems and agriculture in urban settings and for communities of color. This form of work utilizes teaching sustainable farming techniques to urban communities to initiate the production of fresh foods. Norman employs women of color at her urban farm, advocating for an increase in Black and POC farmers. Norman advocates for a rise in Black owned businesses through creating a platform, Patchwork City Farms, for other Black farmers to find success in urban farming. Norman's work emphasizes the need for a "reclamation" of the Black farmer and the historically rich narratives of Black agricultural system.

At the Slow Food's Terra Madre Salone del Gusto, in Turin, Italy, Norman served as the 2014 US delegate. Norman is involved in many urban agriculture initiatives, including her role as manager and founding member of the program: South West Atlanta Growers Cooperative (SWAG Coop), which was founded in 2010. Norman is also a member on the board of Georgia Organics, a non-profit organization. Norman co-founded EAT MOVE BeWELL, a program that focuses on providing information on how to provide fresh foods to communities of color and in urban landscapes.Norman is also a part of the Black-led conservation group called West Atlanta Watershed Alliance. Norman and Patchwork City Farms has been notably mentioned in Modern Farmer Magazine, SeedStock.com, The Library of Congress and Southern Foodways Alliance oral history project, and Farm Star Living.
